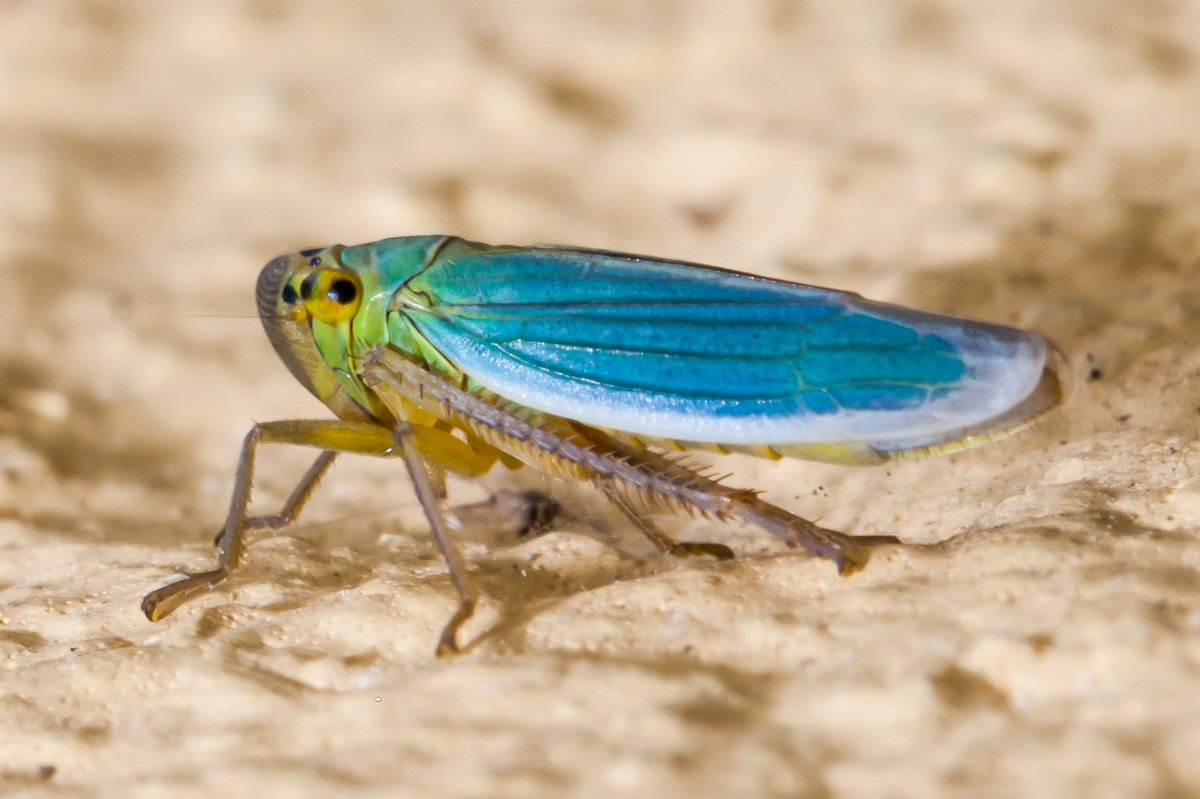
- Cicadella viridis, side view
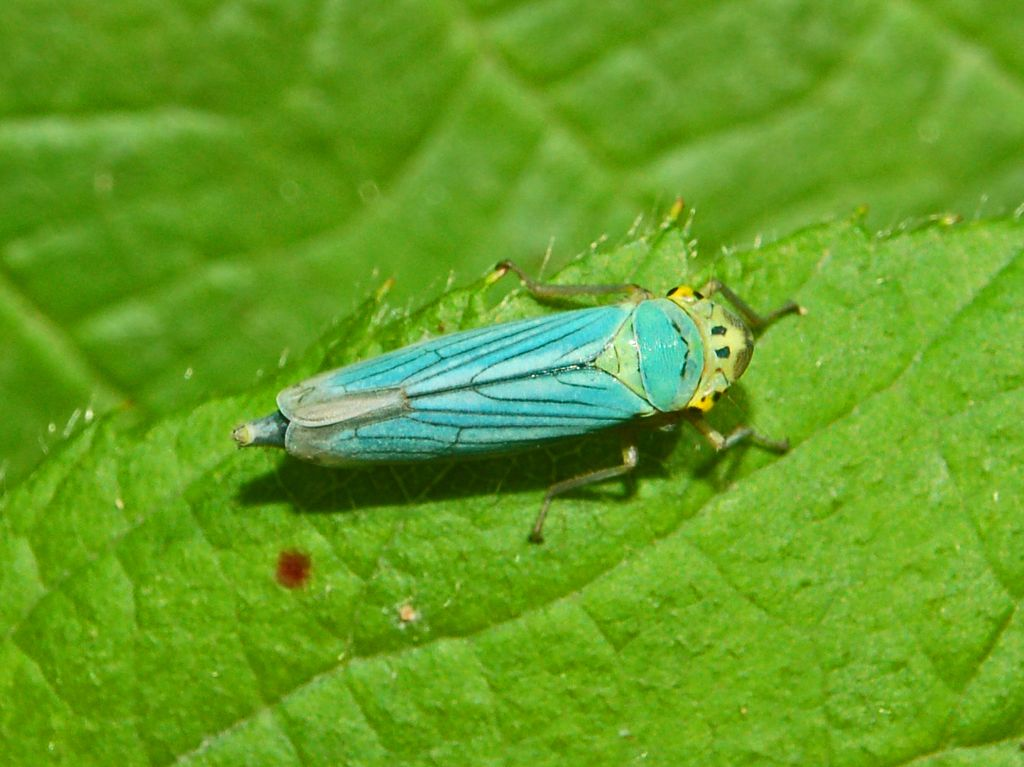
- Upperside

Scientific classification
- Kingdom: Animalia
- Phylum: Arthropoda
- Class: Insecta
- Order: Hemiptera
- Suborder: Auchenorrhyncha
- Family: Cicadellidae
- Subfamily: Cicadellinae
- Tribe: Cicadellini
- Genus: Cicadella
- Species: C. viridis

Binomial name
- Cicadella viridis (Linnaeus, 1758)

= Cicadella viridis =

Species of true bug

Cicadella viridis, sometimes called the "green leafhopper" (but not to be confused with Nephotettix a genus that includes rice pests), is a species of European leafhoppers belonging to the subfamily Cicadellinae.

== Distribution ==
This species is present in most of Europe, in eastern Palearctic realm, in the Near East, in the Nearctic realm, and in the Indomalayan realm.

== Habitat ==
These leafhoppers inhabit rough grassy areas, peat bogs and mires, wet meadows, near marshes or in swampy habitats, but sometimes live also in drier areas.

== Description ==
The adult males of Cicadella viridis can reach a length of 5.7–7 millimetres (0.22–0.28 in), but the females are quite larger than the males, reaching 7.5–9 millimetres (0.30–0.35 in).

Their pronotum and scutellum are green and yellow. The front head is pale yellow, with two black spots near the compound eyes. The forewings are turquoise green in the females, blue or dark bluish in males (sexual dimorphism). The abdomen is bluish-black.

The larvae are yellowish and have two brownish stripes running from head to the end of the abdomen.

== Biology ==
Adult leafhoppers can mostly be encountered from July through October.

These leafhoppers are polyphagous, feeding on the sap of various species of herbaceous plants, mainly Juncus effusus (Juncaceae sp.), Carex and Scirpus sylvaticus (Cyperaceae sp.), Holcus mollis (Poaceae sp.), Galium palustre (Rubiaceae) and Fabaceae species.

Cicadella viridis may have one or more generations per year. In the colder parts of Europe, there is one generation per year, in the warmer parts two, and in some regions even three generations. In the temperate climate of Europe, females lay eggs in late August - early November. This species overwinters in the egg stage. Nymphs appear in the spring. The transformation of nymphs into adults occurs in June or in July.

The 'Green Leafhoppers' are mainly preyed by spiders (Parasteatoda tepidariorum, Dolomedes fimbriatus, Tetragnatha extensa). Possible parasites are several Dryinidae species. Moreover several parasitoids of the family Mymaridae (Anagrus species) lay their eggs in eggs of these leafhoppers.

== Gallery ==
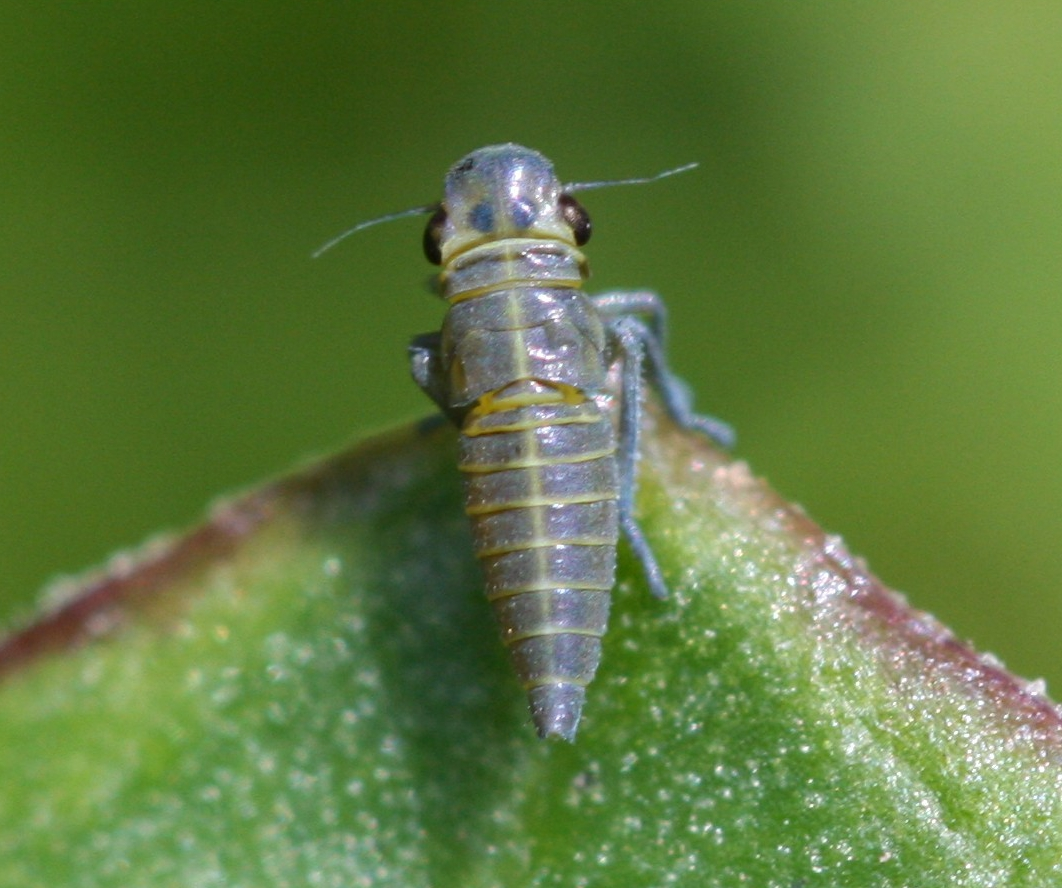
Nymph of Cicadella viridis

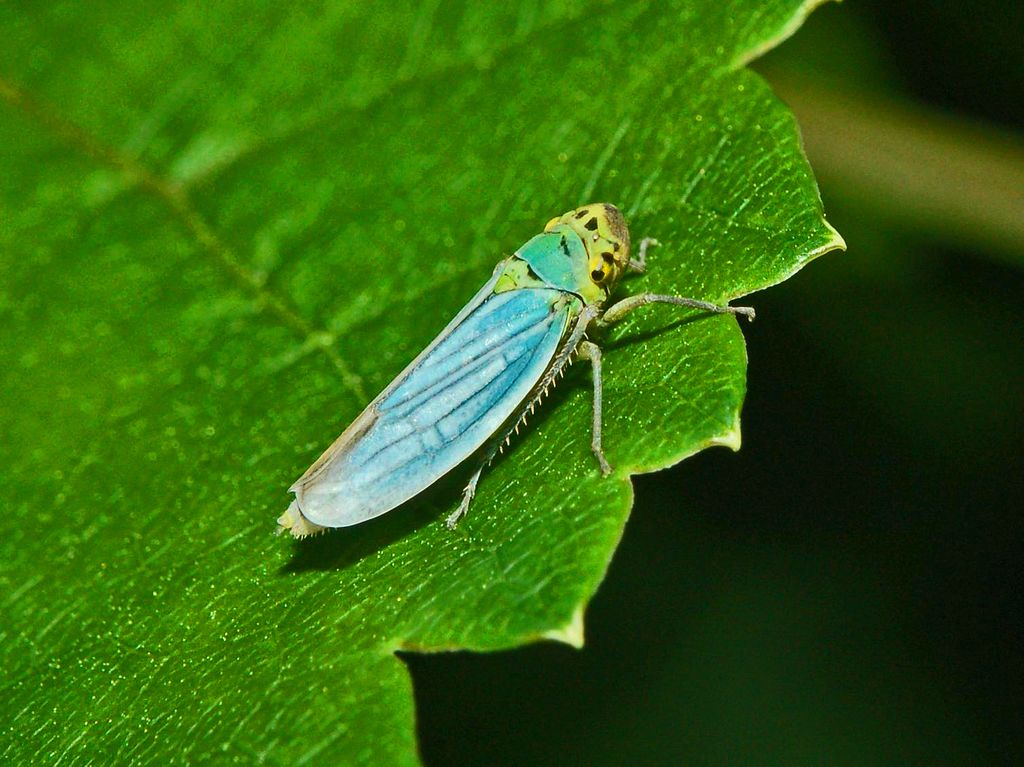
Male

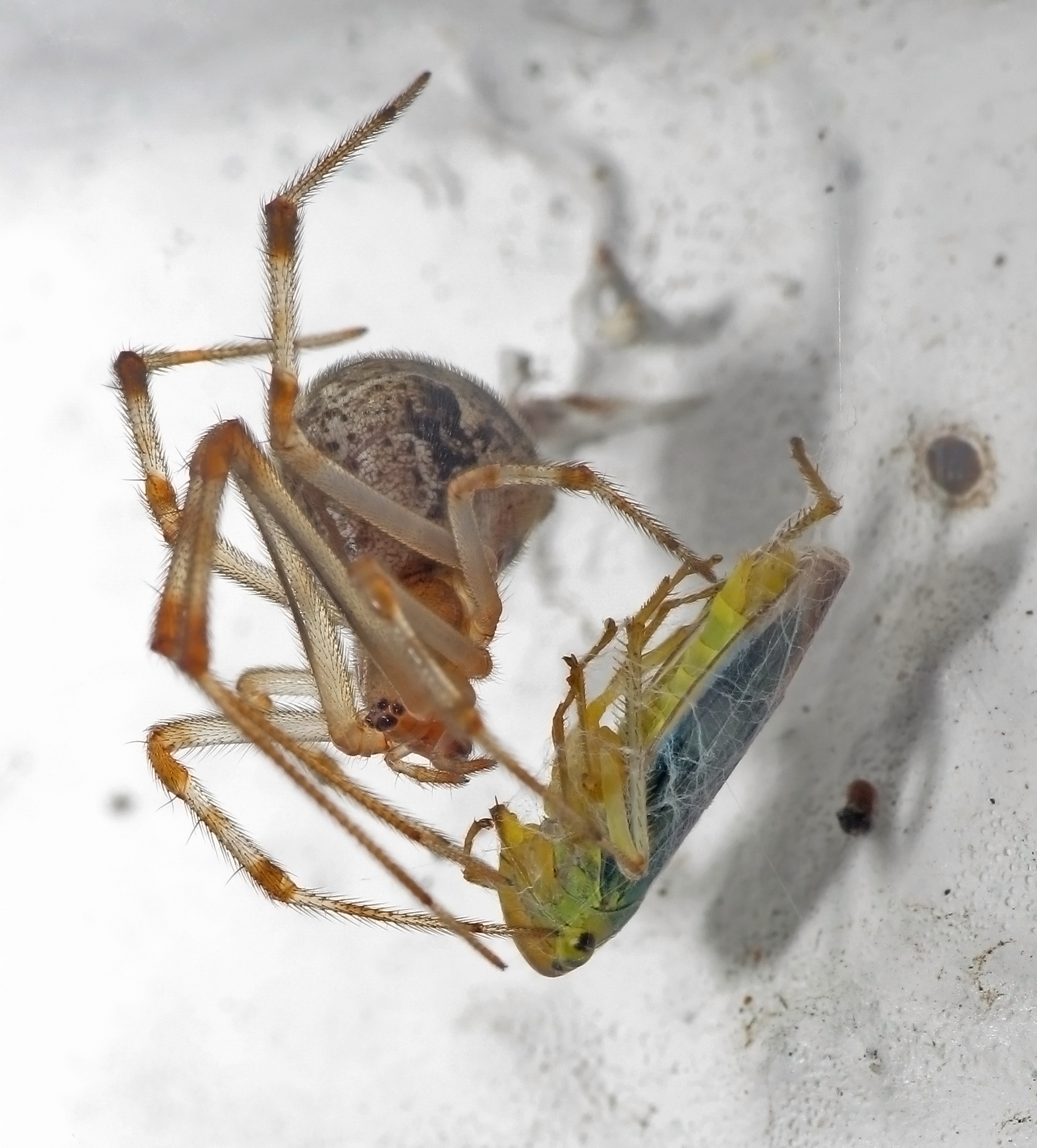
C. viridis preyed by a spider (Parasteatoda tepidariorum)

Video clip
