= Draeculacephala minerva =

Scientific classification
- Domain: Eukaryota
- Kingdom: Animalia
- Phylum: Arthropoda
- Class: Insecta
- Order: Hemiptera
- Suborder: Auchenorrhyncha
- Family: Cicadellidae
- Tribe: Cicadellini
- Genus: Draeculacephala
- Species: D. minerva

Binomial name
- Draeculacephala minerva Ball, 1927

Species of true bug

Draeculacephala minerva (sometimes known as the grass sharpshooter or green sharpshooter), is a species in the family Cicadellidae.
