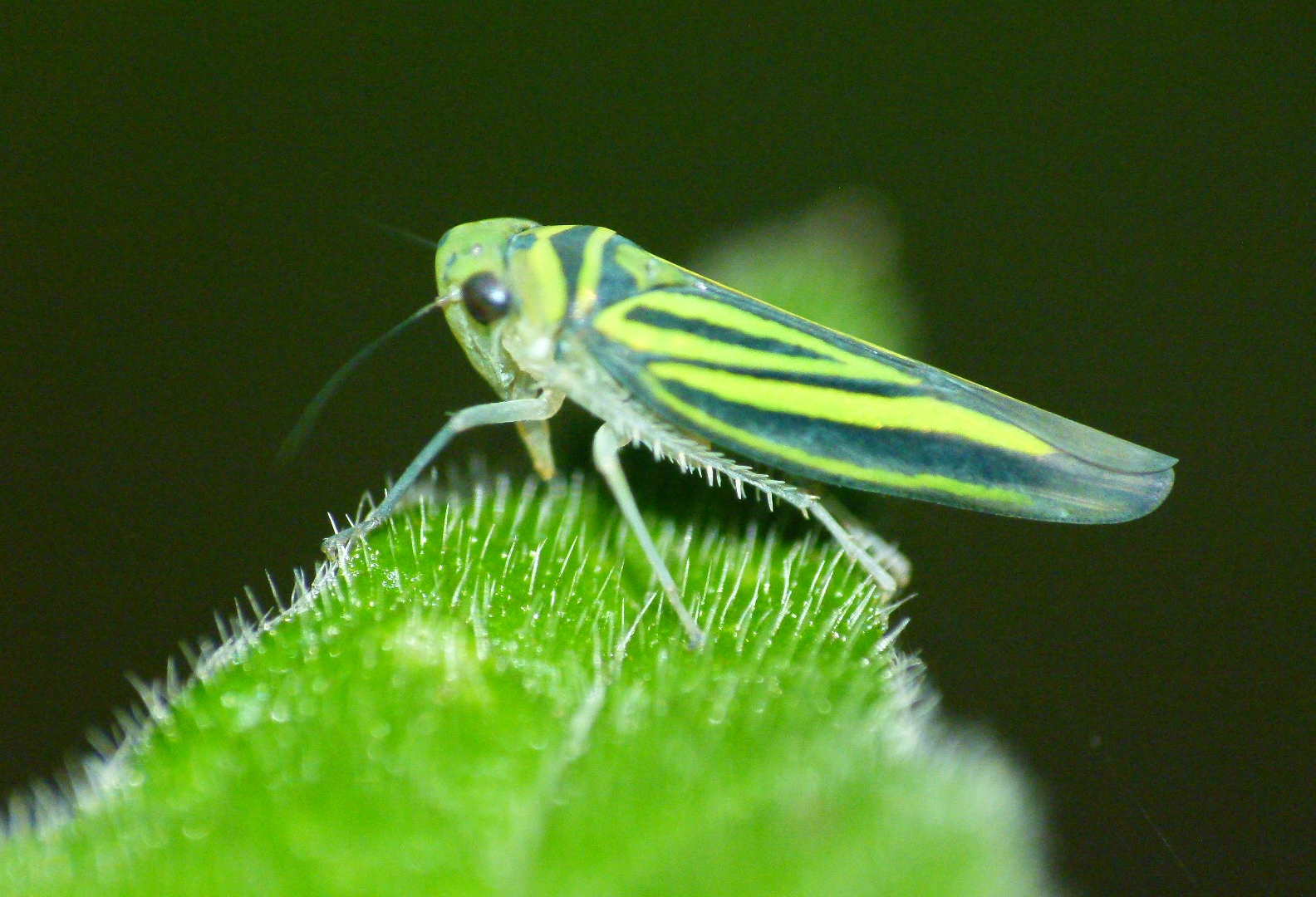
- Atkinsoniella opponens

Scientific classification
- Kingdom: Animalia
- Phylum: Arthropoda
- Clade: Pancrustacea
- Class: Insecta
- Order: Hemiptera
- Suborder: Auchenorrhyncha
- Family: Cicadellidae
- Subfamily: Cicadellinae
- Tribe: Cicadellini
- Genus: Atkinsoniella; Distant, 1908

Type species
- Atkinsoniella decisa Distant, 1908

= Atkinsoniella =

Genus of leafhoppers

Atkinsoniella is a genus of leafhoppers. Nearly 102 species are known in the genus and most of these species are distributed in the Oriental and Palearctic Realms. They are polyphagous and found mainly in high rainfall regions. They are light coloured with contrasting black markings and red, yellow, green, or orange markings. They are polymorphic and sexually dimorphic making identification by sight difficult.

The generic name honours the entomologist Edwin Felix Thomas Atkinson (1840–1890).

== Species ==
- Atkinsoniella albimacula Yang & Li, 2002
- Atkinsoniella albipenna Yang, Meng & Li, 2017
- Atkinsoniella alcmena (Distant, 1908)
- Atkinsoniella alternata Young, 1986
- Atkinsoniella anabella Young, 1986
- Atkinsoniella angula Kuoh, 1992
- Atkinsoniella atrata Yang, Meng & Li, 2017
- Atkinsoniella atronotata (Distant, 1918)
- Atkinsoniella aurantiaca Cai & Kuoh, 1995
- Atkinsoniella beaka Yang, Meng & Li, 2017
- Atkinsoniella bella (Walker, 1851)
- Atkinsoniella biostiolum Jiang & Yang, 2024
- Atkinsoniella biundulata Meng, Yang & Ni, 2010
- Atkinsoniella bowa Yang, Meng & Li, 2017
- Atkinsoniella brevistyla Yang & Li, 2004
- Atkinsoniella changae Yang, Meng & Li, 2017
- Atkinsoniella chongqingana Jiang & Yang, 2024
- Atkinsoniella contrariuscula (Jacobi, 1944)
- Atkinsoniella curvata Zhang & Kuoh, 1993
- Atkinsoniella cuspidata Meng, Yang & Ni, 2010
- Atkinsoniella cyclops (Melichar, 1914)
- Atkinsoniella dactylia Yang & Li, 2000
- Atkinsoniella decisa Distant, 1908
- Atkinsoniella divaricata Yang, Meng & Li, 2017
- Atkinsoniella dormana Li, 1992
- Atkinsoniella dubia Young, 1986
- Atkinsoniella duna Yang, Meng & Li, 2017
- Atkinsoniella expanda Yang, Meng & Li, 2017
- Atkinsoniella fishtaila Yang, Meng & Li, 2017
- Atkinsoniella fistular Naveed & Zhang, 2018
- Atkinsoniella flavilega Yang, Meng & Li, 2017
- Atkinsoniella flavipenna Li & Wang, 1992
- Atkinsoniella flexa Kuoh, 1992
- Atkinsoniella furipygofera Yang & Li, 2011
- Atkinsoniella fuscopenna Yang & Li, 2004
- Atkinsoniella goosenecka Yang, Meng & Li, 2017
- Atkinsoniella grahami Young, 1986
- Atkinsoniella gregalis (Distant, 1908)
- Atkinsoniella guttata Kuoh, 1992
- Atkinsoniella heae Yang, Meng & Li, 2017
- Atkinsoniella heiyuana Li, 1992
- Atkinsoniella hippocampus Jiang & Yang, 2025
- Atkinsoniella huangi Yang & Zhang, 2000
- Atkinsoniella hupehna Young, 1986
- Atkinsoniella insignata (Haupt, 1924)
- Atkinsoniella javana (Melichar, 1914)
- Atkinsoniella jini Yang, Meng & Li, 2017
- Atkinsoniella latior Young, 1986
- Atkinsoniella lii Yang & Zhang, 2000
- Atkinsoniella likuni Jiang & Yang, 2024
- Atkinsoniella limba Kuoh, 1991
- Atkinsoniella liui Yang, Meng & Li, 2017
- Atkinsoniella longa Yang, Meng & Li, 2017
- Atkinsoniella longiaurita Yang, Meng & Li, 2017
- Atkinsoniella longiuscula Feng & Zhang, 2015
- Atkinsoniella malaisei Young, 1986
- Atkinsoniella mediofasciola Yang & Li, 2002
- Atkinsoniella membrana Yang, Meng & Li, 2017
- Atkinsoniella motuoensis Meng, Yang & Ni, 2010
- Atkinsoniella multiseta Yang, Meng & Li, 2017
- Atkinsoniella mungphuensis (Distant, 1908)
- Atkinsoniella nigra Kuoh & Cai, 1994
- Atkinsoniella nigricephala Li, 1992
- Atkinsoniella nigridorsum Kuoh & Zhou, 1996
- Atkinsoniella nigripennis Yang & Li, 1999
- Atkinsoniella nigriscens Yang & Li, 2004
- Atkinsoniella nigrisigna Li, 1992
- Atkinsoniella nigrita Zhang & Kuoh, 1993
- Atkinsoniella nigrominiatula (Jacobi, 1944)
- Atkinsoniella nigrosteaka Li & Wang, 1994
- Atkinsoniella opponens (Walker, 1851)
- Atkinsoniella peaka Yang, Meng & Li, 2017
- Atkinsoniella piscioscillum Jiang & Yang, 2025
- Atkinsoniella punica Yang & Li, 2002
- Atkinsoniella recta Yang, Meng & Li, 2017
- Atkinsoniella rectangulata Yang, Meng & Li, 2017
- Atkinsoniella rhomboida Yang, Meng & Li, 2017
- Atkinsoniella rinkihonis Matsumura, 1912
- Atkinsoniella rubrostriata Kuoh, 1992
- Atkinsoniella rufistigma Yang, Meng & Li, 2017
- Atkinsoniella steelei Young, 1986
- Atkinsoniella stenopyga Jiang & Yang, 2023
- Atkinsoniella sulphurata (Distant, 1908)
- Atkinsoniella thalia (Distant, 1918)
- Atkinsoniella thaloidea Young, 1986
- Atkinsoniella tiani Yang, Meng & Li, 2017
- Atkinsoniella transifasciata Yang, Meng & Li, 2017
- Atkinsoniella tridentata Yang & Li, 2011
- Atkinsoniella tripunctata Dmitriev, 2020
- Atkinsoniella tuberostyla Yang, Meng & Li, 2017
- Atkinsoniella uniguttata Li, 1993
- Atkinsoniella variata Young, 1986
- Atkinsoniella vesta (Distant, 1908)
- Atkinsoniella wangi Jiang & Yang, 2023
- Atkinsoniella warpa Yang, Meng & Li, 2017
- Atkinsoniella wui Yang, Meng & Li, 2017
- Atkinsoniella xanthoabdomena Yang, Meng & Li, 2017
- Atkinsoniella xanthonota Kuoh, 1994
- Atkinsoniella xanthovena Yang & Li, 2002
- Atkinsoniella xanthovitta Kuoh, 1994
- Atkinsoniella xinfengi Yang, Meng & Li, 2017
- Atkinsoniella yani Yang, Meng & Li, 2017
- Atkinsoniella yingjiangensis Jiang & Yang, 2023
- Atkinsoniella yunnanana Yang, Meng & Li, 2017
- Atkinsoniella zaihuai Yang & Meng, 2011
- Atkinsoniella zhangmuensis Yang, Meng & Li, 2017
- Atkinsoniella zizhongi Jiang & Yang, 2022
