= Madaura =

Madaura may refer to:

- the city of Madauros
- Lucius Apuleius of Madaura
- Madaura (leafhopper), a genus of insects in the tribe Cicadellini
