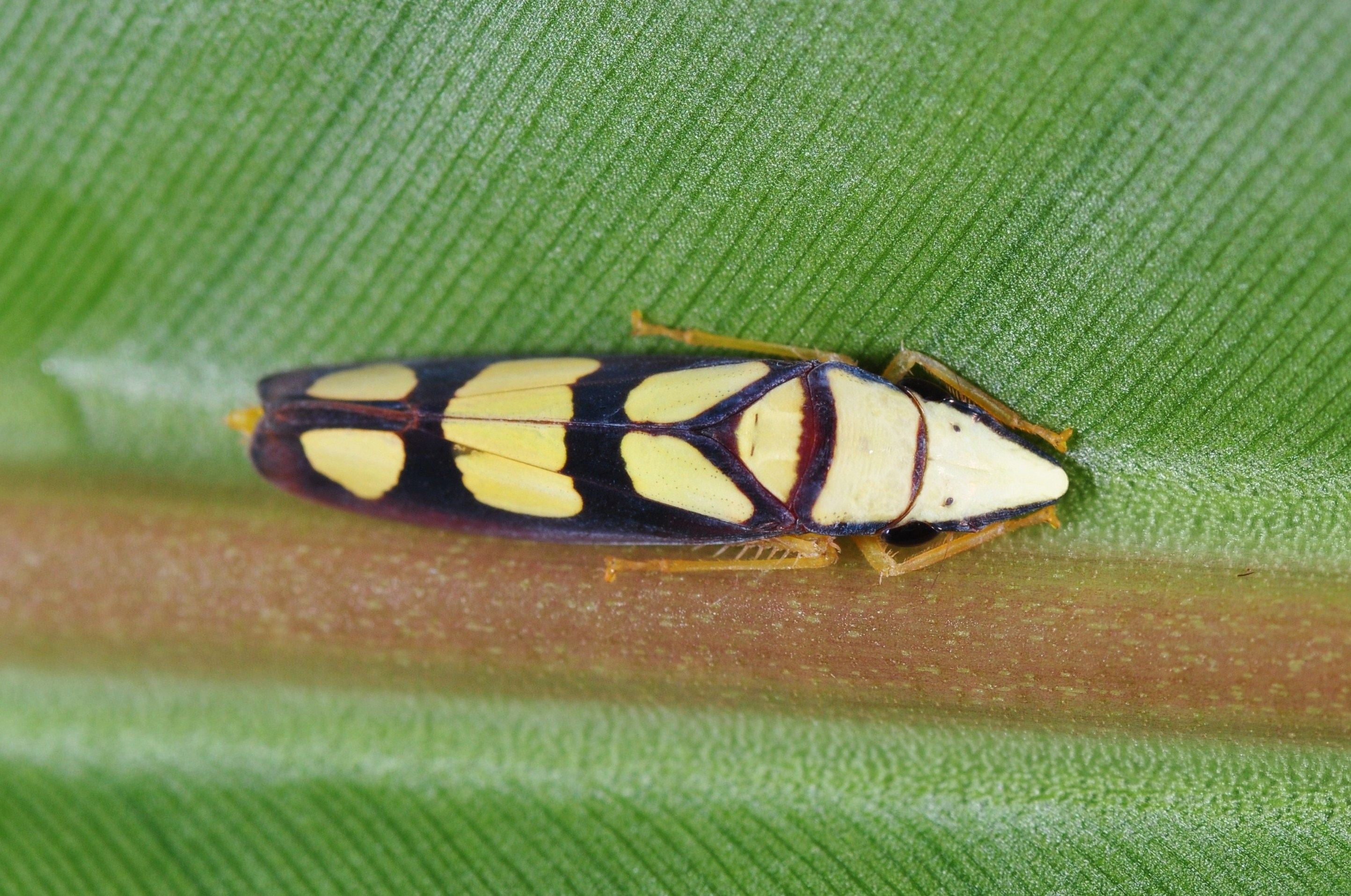
- Platygonia spatulata

Scientific classification
- Domain: Eukaryota
- Kingdom: Animalia
- Phylum: Arthropoda
- Class: Insecta
- Order: Hemiptera
- Suborder: Auchenorrhyncha
- Family: Cicadellidae
- Subfamily: Cicadellinae
- Tribe: Cicadellini
- Genus: Platygonia; Melichar, 1924

Synonyms
- Oxycoryphia Melichar, 1926; Oxygonalia Evans, 1947; Oxygonia Melichar, 1926

= Platygonia =

Genus of insects

Platygonia is a genus of central American leafhoppers in the tribe Cicadellini, erected by Leopold Melichar in 1924.

== Species ==
The Global Biodiversity Information Facility lists:

1. Platygonia angrana Young, 1977
2. Platygonia detecta Young, 1977
3. Platygonia ignifer (Walker, 1851)
4. Platygonia infulata Young, 1977
5. Platygonia nigra Quintas, Pecly, Carvalho & Mejdalani, 2022
6. Platygonia praestantior (Fowler, 1899) - type species (as Tettigonia praestantior Fowler)
7. Platygonia spatulata (Signoret, 1854)
8. Platygonia undecimmaculata (Fowler, 1899)
9. Platygonia zea (Distant, 1908)
