= Tylozygus infulatus =

Scientific classification
- Domain: Eukaryota
- Kingdom: Animalia
- Phylum: Arthropoda
- Class: Insecta
- Order: Hemiptera
- Suborder: Auchenorrhyncha
- Family: Cicadellidae
- Genus: Tylozygus
- Species: T. infulatus

Binomial name
- Tylozygus infulatus Nielson & Godoy, 1995

Species of sharpshooter

Tylozygus infulatus is a species of sharpshooter in the family Cicadellidae.
