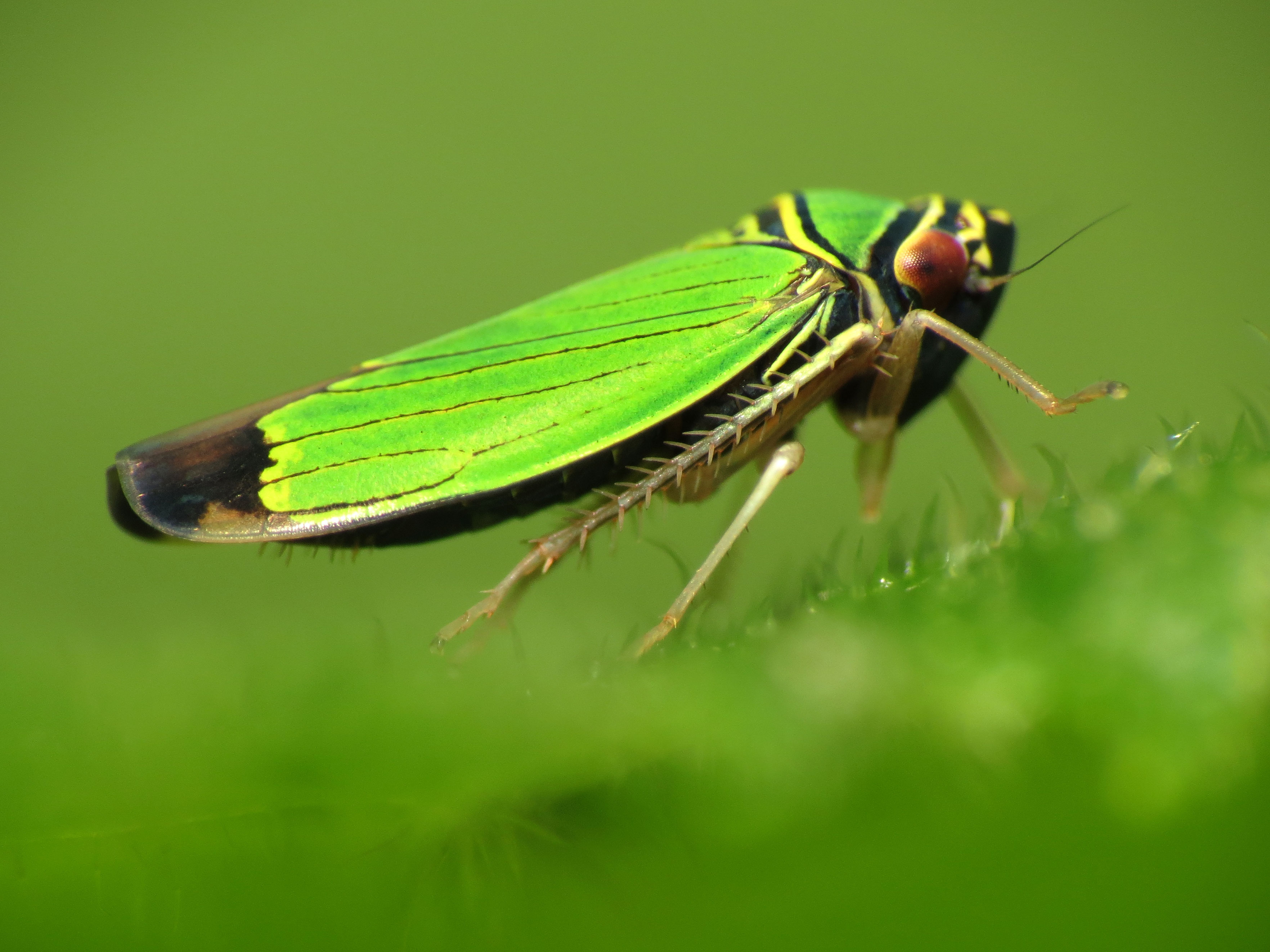

Scientific classification
- Domain: Eukaryota
- Kingdom: Animalia
- Phylum: Arthropoda
- Class: Insecta
- Order: Hemiptera
- Suborder: Auchenorrhyncha
- Family: Cicadellidae
- Genus: Tylozygus
- Species: T. geometricus

Binomial name
- Tylozygus geometricus (Signoret, 1854)

= Tylozygus geometricus =

Species of true bug

Tylozygus geometricus is a species of sharpshooter in the family Cicadellidae.

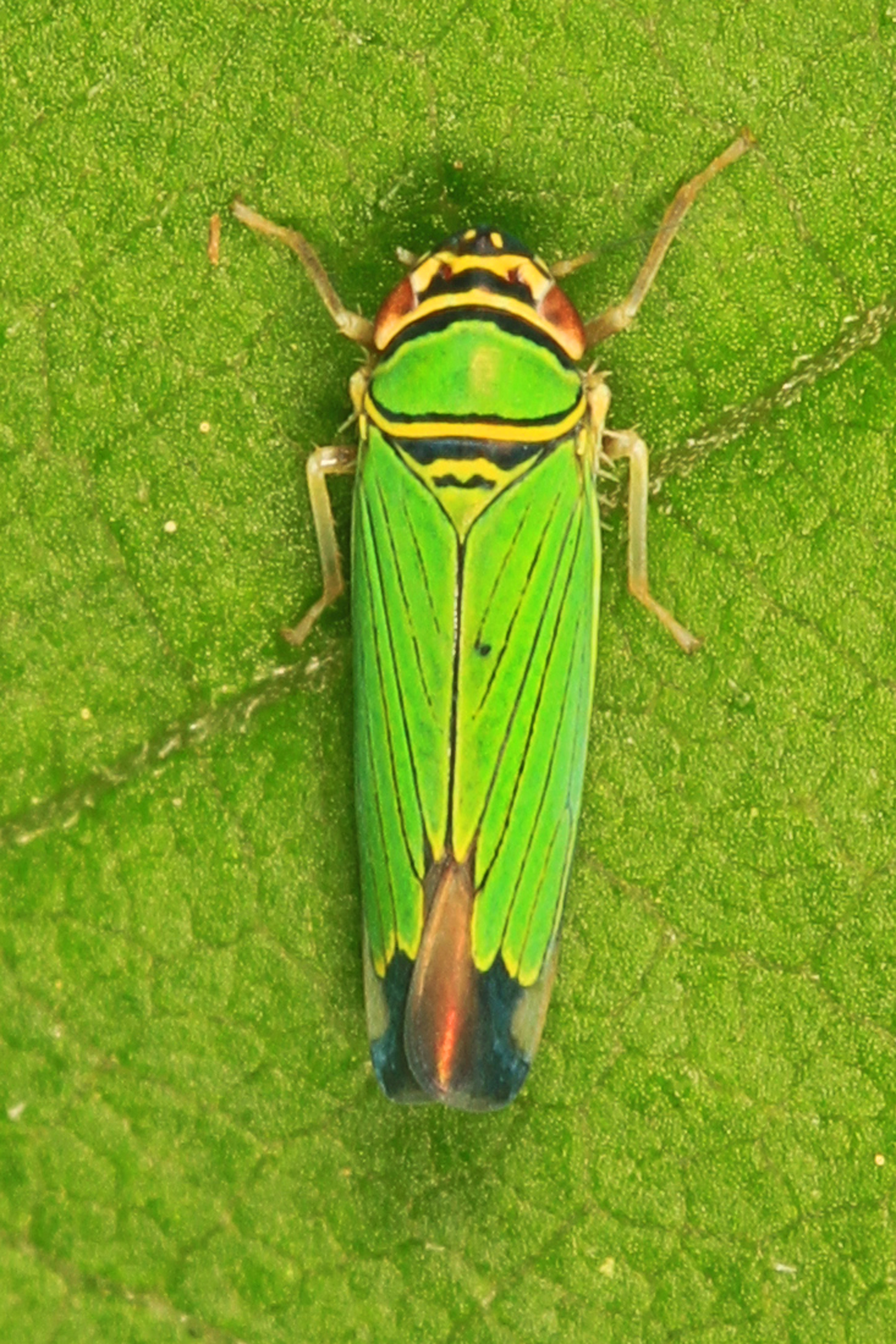
