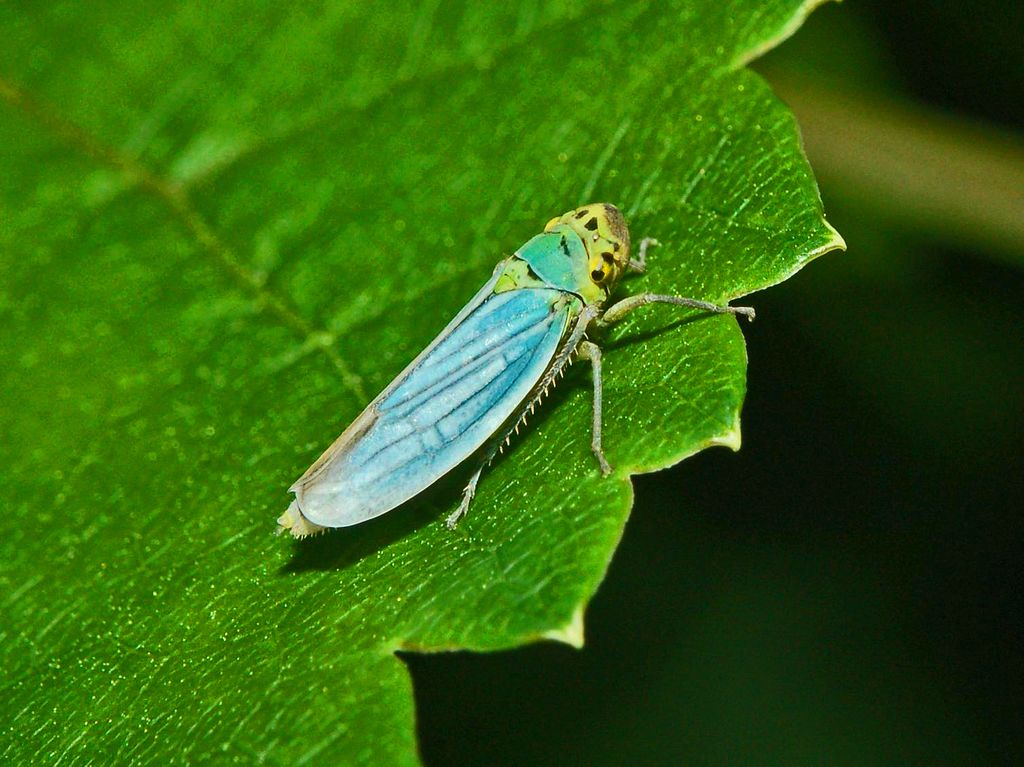
- Cicadella viridis

Scientific classification
- Domain: Eukaryota
- Kingdom: Animalia
- Phylum: Arthropoda
- Class: Insecta
- Order: Hemiptera
- Suborder: Auchenorrhyncha
- Family: Cicadellidae
- Tribe: Cicadellini
- Genus: Cicadella; Latreille, 1817

Synonyms
- Selected (also various mis-spellings): Ablycephalus Curtis, 1831; Amblycephalus Curtis, 1831; Cicadellia Latreille, 1817; Promecopsis Duméril, 1806; Tettigonia Olivier, 1789; Tettigonies Geoffroy, 1762; Teitogonia China & Fennah, 1945; Teltigonia Goldfuss, 1820; Tetigonia Blanchard, 1852; Tetigonia Geoffroy, 1762; Tetigoniella Geoffroy, 1762; Tettigella China & Fennah, 1945

= Cicadella =

Genus of leafhoppers

Cicadella is the type genus of leafhoppers in the subfamily Cicadellinae and tribe Cicadellini. Species are found mostly in Europe and Asia, but there are also records from Africa and the Americas.

Cicadella was named by Pierre André Latreille in 1817; earlier authorities had placed species (and those of similar genera) in the pre-occupied Tettigonia L., 1758: the genus of large bush crickets. There were also many orthographic variants.

== Species ==
The Global Biodiversity Information Facility lists:

1. Cicadella aequalis (Signoret, 1854)
2. Cicadella ambigua (Montrouzier, 1864)
3. Cicadella antiqua (Heer, 1853)
4. Cicadella aurantiaca (Heer, 1853)
5. Cicadella chazei (Piton, 1940)
6. Cicadella cinctella (Taschenberg, 1884)
7. Cicadella cuneata (Montrouzier, 1864)
8. Cicadella flavofasciata (Taschenberg, 1884)
9. Cicadella flavomarginata (Melichar, 1902)
10. Cicadella fumosa Kuoh & Zhang, 1991
11. Cicadella lasiocarpae Ossiannilsson, 1981
12. Cicadella longispina (Montrouzier, 1864)
13. Cicadella (Tettigonia) maculata Meunier, 1923
14. Cicadella mellatula (Breddin, 1901)
15. Cicadella morio (Heer, 1853)
16. Cicadella occipitula Osborn, 1926
17. Cicadella parobtecta Dmitriev, 2020
18. Cicadella priscomarginata (Scudder, 1890)
19. Cicadella priscotincta (Scudder, 1890)
20. Cicadella priscovariegata (Scudder, 1890)
21. Cicadella prolixa (Lethierry, 1881)
22. Cicadella quinquepunctata (Taschenberg, 1884)
23. Cicadella scudderi Cockerell, 1920
24. Cicadella viridis (Linnaeus, 1758) - type species (as Cicada viridis L.)
