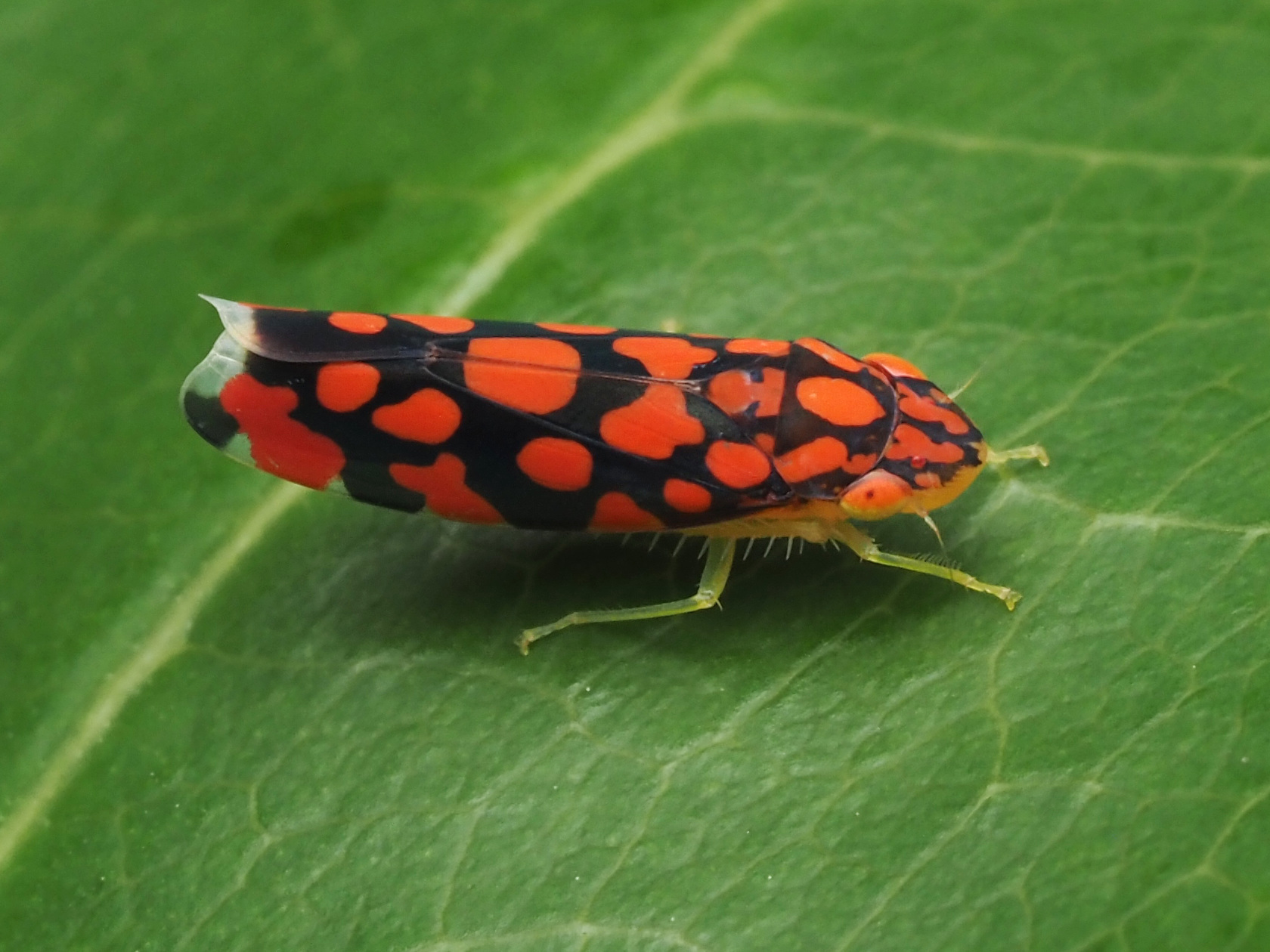
- Ladoffa cavillator

Scientific classification
- Domain: Eukaryota
- Kingdom: Animalia
- Phylum: Arthropoda
- Class: Insecta
- Order: Hemiptera
- Suborder: Auchenorrhyncha
- Family: Cicadellidae
- Tribe: Cicadellini
- Genus: Ladoffa; Young, 1977

Type species
- Tettigonia ignota (Walker, 1851)

= Ladoffa =

Genus of leafhoppers

Ladoffa is a genus of leafhoppers, found from Mexico to Argentina. Their dorsal surface is typically colored red and black.

== Species ==
As of 2025, 42 species are recognized:

- Ladoffa aguilari Lozada, 1993
- Ladoffa ancistra Freytag & Lozada, 2013
- Ladoffa arcuata Young, 1977
- Ladoffa bartletti Freytag & Lozada, 2013
- Ladoffa bifurca Freytag & Lozada, 2013
- Ladoffa breva Freytag & Lozada, 2013
- Ladoffa cavillator Young, 1977
- Ladoffa coccinea (Fowler, 1900)
- Ladoffa comitis Young, 1977
- Ladoffa dentata Freytag & Lozada, 2013
- Ladoffa dependens Young, 1977
- Ladoffa donsana Young, 1977
- Ladoffa elauta Young, 1977
- Ladoffa enochra Young, 1977
- Ladoffa flexa Freytag & Lozada, 2013
- Ladoffa grandis Lozada & Freytag, 2010
- Ladoffa guianae Freytag & Lozada, 2013
- Ladoffa guttata (Signoret, 1854)
- Ladoffa ignota (Walker, 1851)
- Ladoffa insperata Young, 1977
- Ladoffa isabellina Cavichioli & Chiamolera, 2001
- Ladoffa lamasi Lozada & Freytag, 2010
- Ladoffa lentiginosa Young, 1977
- Ladoffa lobata Freytag & Lozada, 2013
- Ladoffa meiota Freytag & Lozada, 2013
- Ladoffa miara Young, 1977
- Ladoffa nozama Young, 1977
- Ladoffa obscurana Young, 1977
- Ladoffa paraensis Young, 1977
- Ladoffa purpurascens (Fowler, 1900)
- Ladoffa reversa Freytag & Lozada, 2013
- Ladoffa rubriguttata (Walker, 1851)
- Ladoffa rubronigra Cavichioli & Chiamolera, 2001
- Ladoffa sannionis Young, 1977
- Ladoffa scopigera Young, 1977
- Ladoffa stenota Freytag & Lozada, 2013
- Ladoffa suttoni Freytag & Lozada, 2013
- Ladoffa trifasciata Cavichioli & Chiamolera, 2001
- Ladoffa uncata Young, 1977
- Ladoffa variolaria Young, 1977
- Ladoffa woldai Lozada & Freytag, 2010
- Ladoffa yusti Young, 1977
