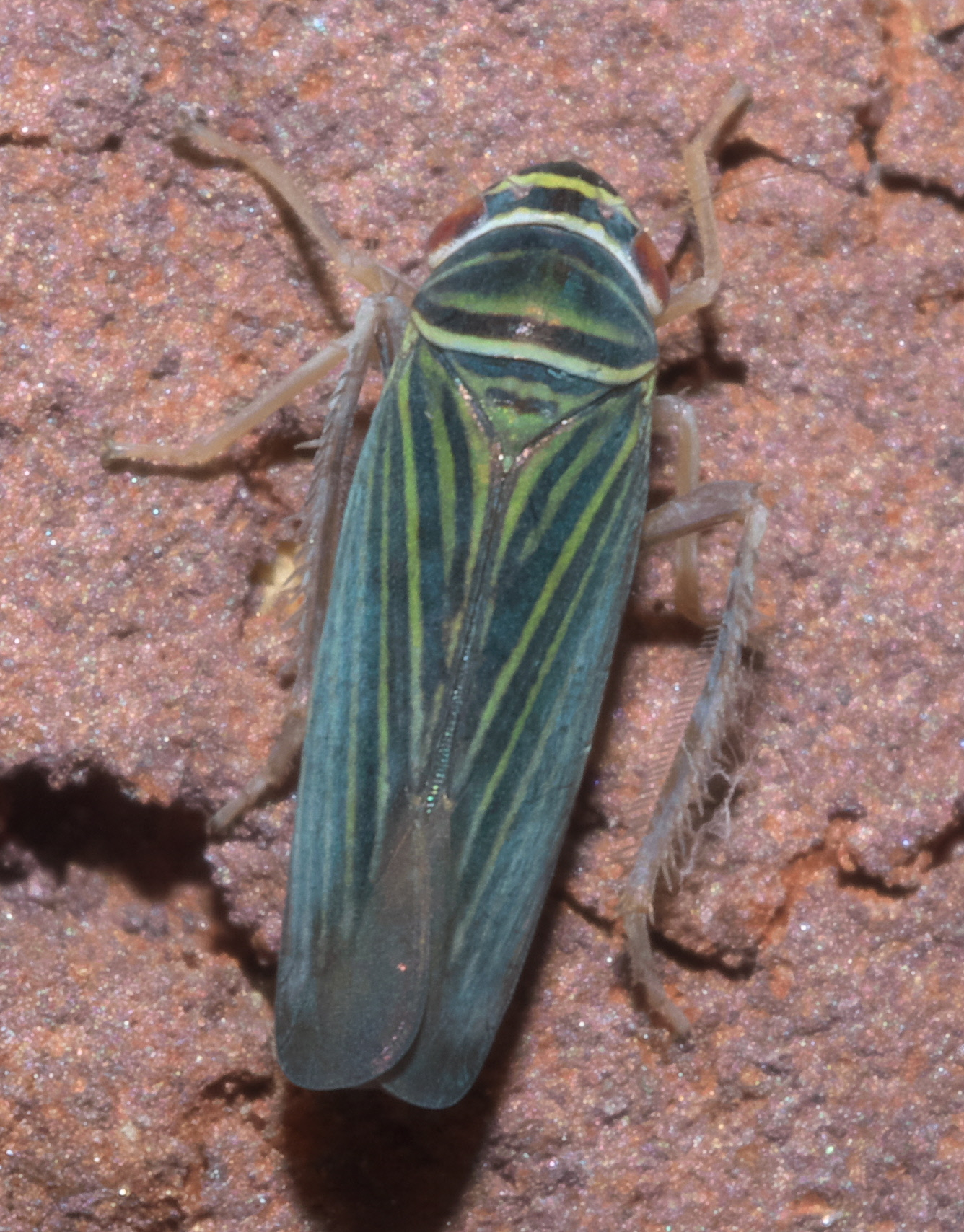
- Tylozygus bifidus

Scientific classification
- Domain: Eukaryota
- Kingdom: Animalia
- Phylum: Arthropoda
- Class: Insecta
- Order: Hemiptera
- Suborder: Auchenorrhyncha
- Family: Cicadellidae
- Tribe: Cicadellini
- Genus: Tylozygus; Fieber, 1865

= Tylozygus =

Genus of leafhoppers

Tylozygus is a genus of leafhoppers in the family Cicadellidae. There are about six described species in Tylozygus.

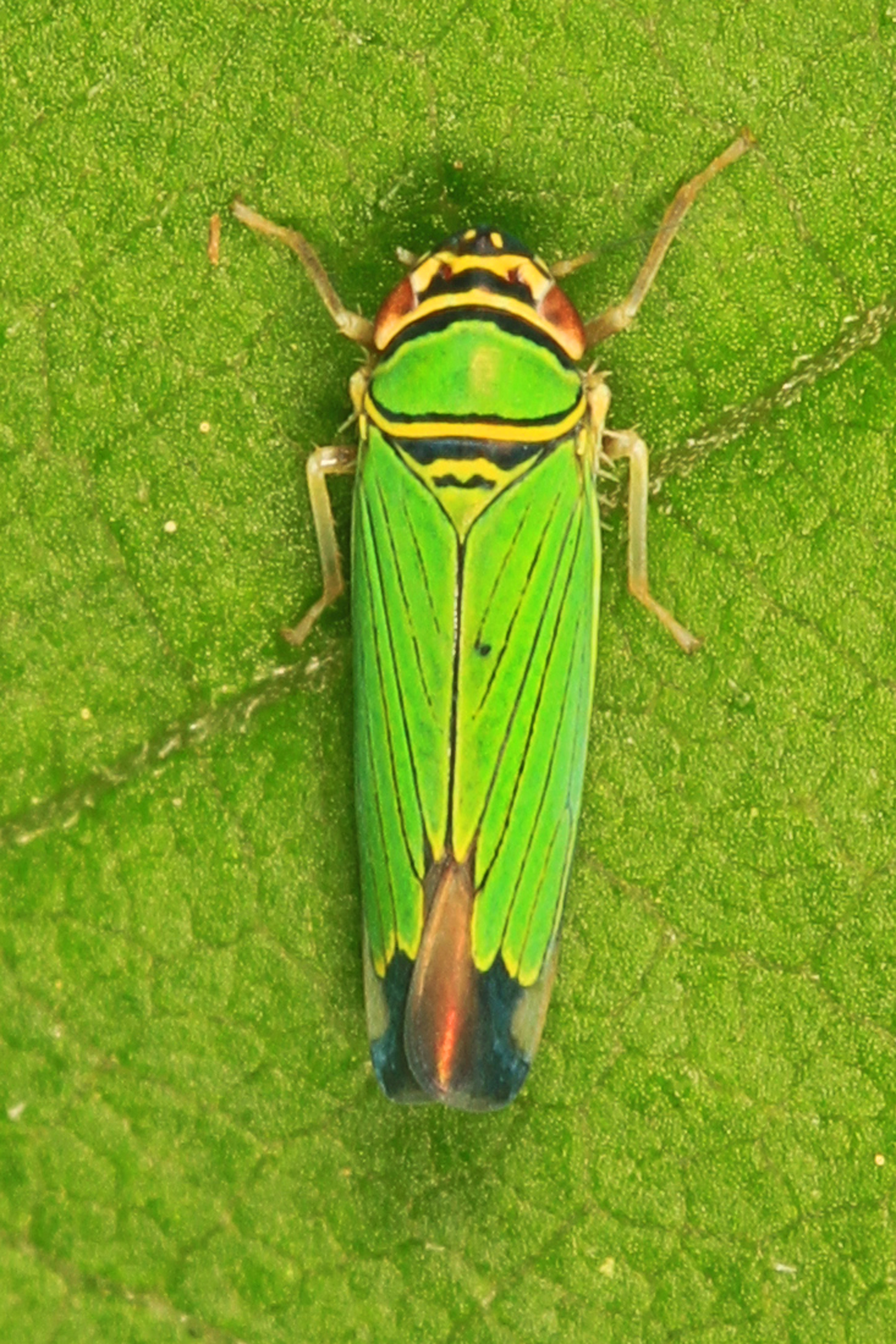
Tylozygus geometricus

== Species ==
These six species belong to the genus Tylozygus:

- Tylozygus bifidus (Say, 1830)^{c g b}
- Tylozygus carabela (Metcalf & Bruner, 1936)^{c g}
- Tylozygus descrepantius Nielson & Godoy, 1995^{c g}
- Tylozygus fasciatus (Walker, F., 1851)^{c}
- Tylozygus geometricus (Signoret, 1854)^{c g b}
- Tylozygus infulatus Nielson & Godoy, 1995^{c g}

Data sources: i = ITIS, c = Catalogue of Life, g = GBIF, b = Bugguide.net
