= Bhandara (leafhopper) =

Scientific classification
- Kingdom: Animalia
- Phylum: Arthropoda
- Clade: Pancrustacea
- Class: Insecta
- Order: Hemiptera
- Suborder: Auchenorrhyncha
- Family: Cicadellidae
- Tribe: Cicadellini
- Genus: Bhandara; Distant, 1908

Genus of leafhoppers

Bhandara is a genus of leafhoppers, found in Southeast Asia. The genus was first identified by English entomologist, William Lucas Distant, in 1908.

== Species ==
Known species include:

- Bhandara arta (Young, 1986)
- Bhandara diaphana (Traschenberg, 1884)
- Bhandara habethana (Young, 1986)
- Bhandara horsfieldi (Distant, 1908)
- Bhandara opacipennis (Young, 1986)
- Bhandara pavo (Signoret, 1853)
- Bhandara semiclara (Signoret, 1853)
- Bhandara semiviterea (Walker, 1858)
- Bhandara stellata (Signoret, 1853)
- Bhandara suavissima (Walker, 1857)
- Bhandara translucida (Young, 1986)
