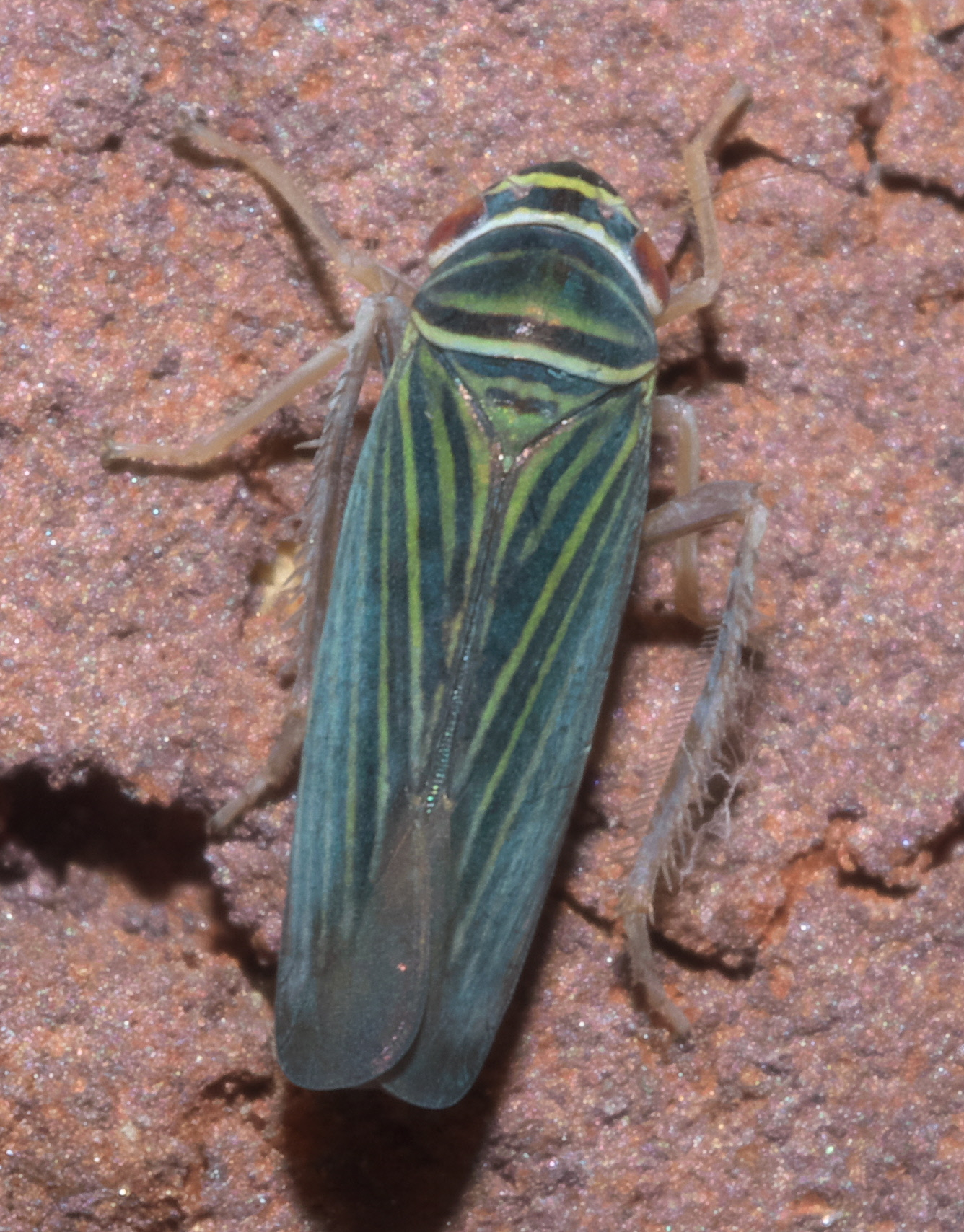

Scientific classification
- Domain: Eukaryota
- Kingdom: Animalia
- Phylum: Arthropoda
- Class: Insecta
- Order: Hemiptera
- Suborder: Auchenorrhyncha
- Family: Cicadellidae
- Genus: Tylozygus
- Species: T. bifidus

Binomial name
- Tylozygus bifidus (Say, 1830)

= Tylozygus bifidus =

Species of true bug

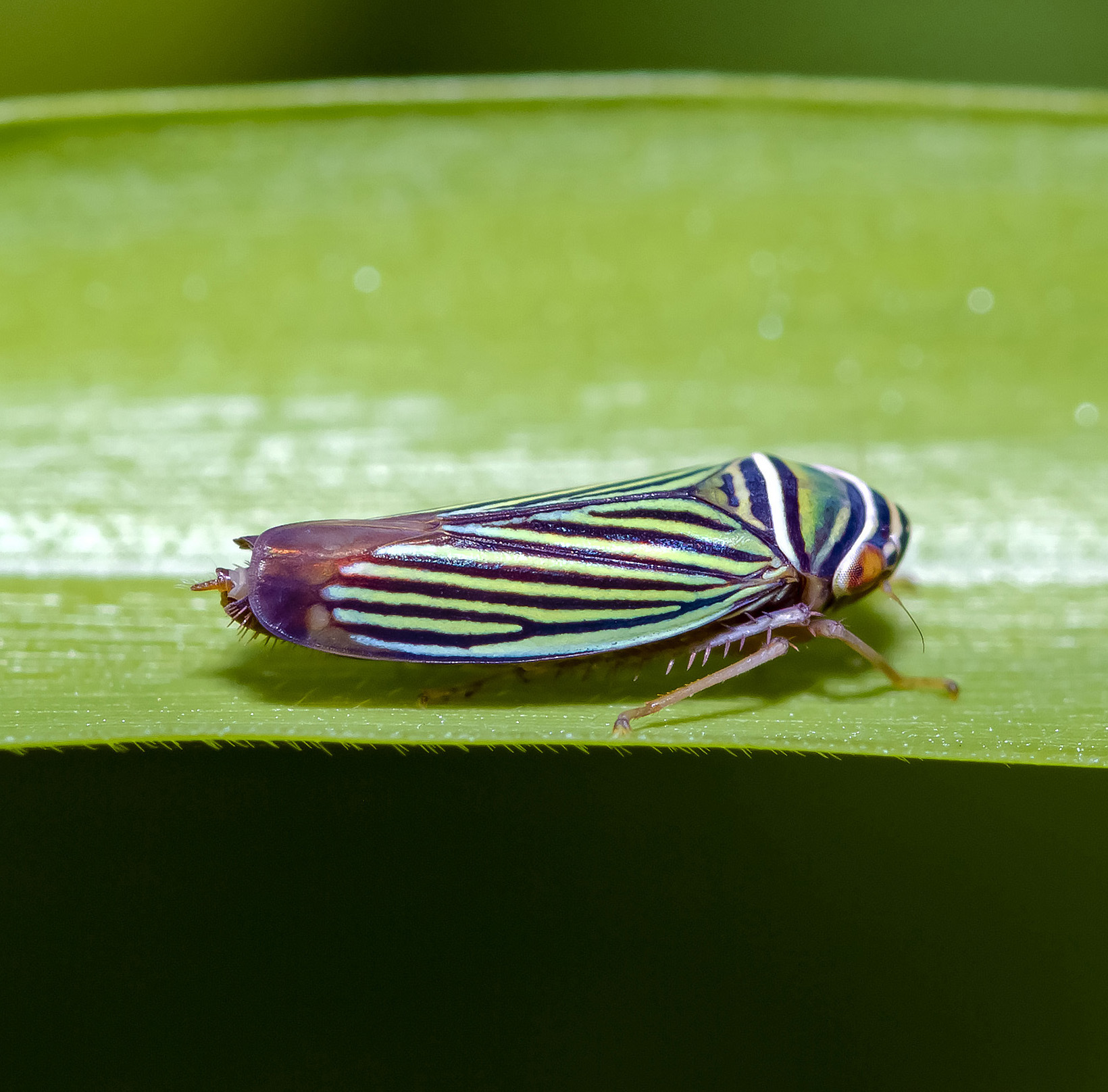
Sharpshooter Tylozygus bifidus

Tylozygus bifidus is a species of sharpshooter in the family Cicadellidae.

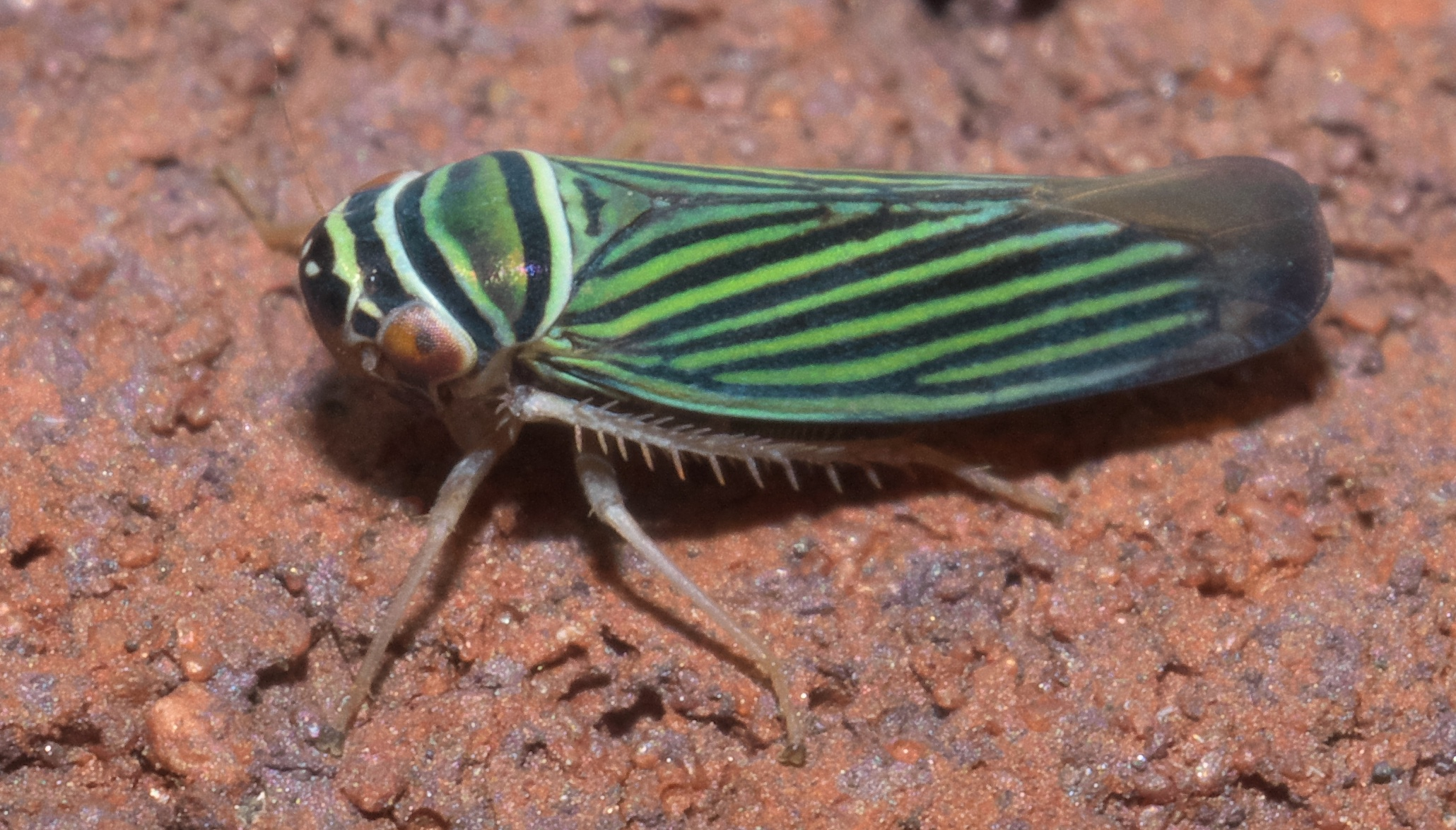

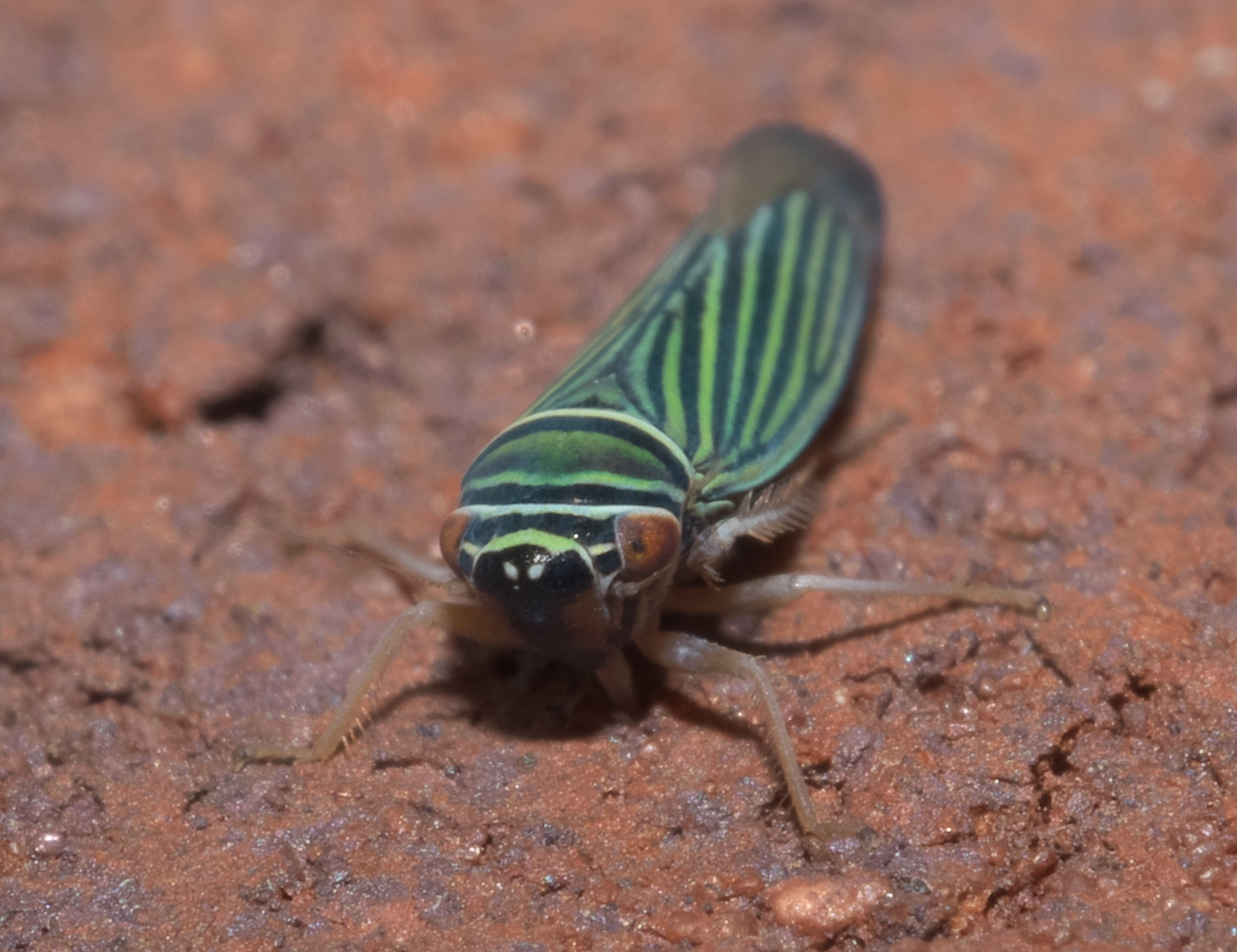
