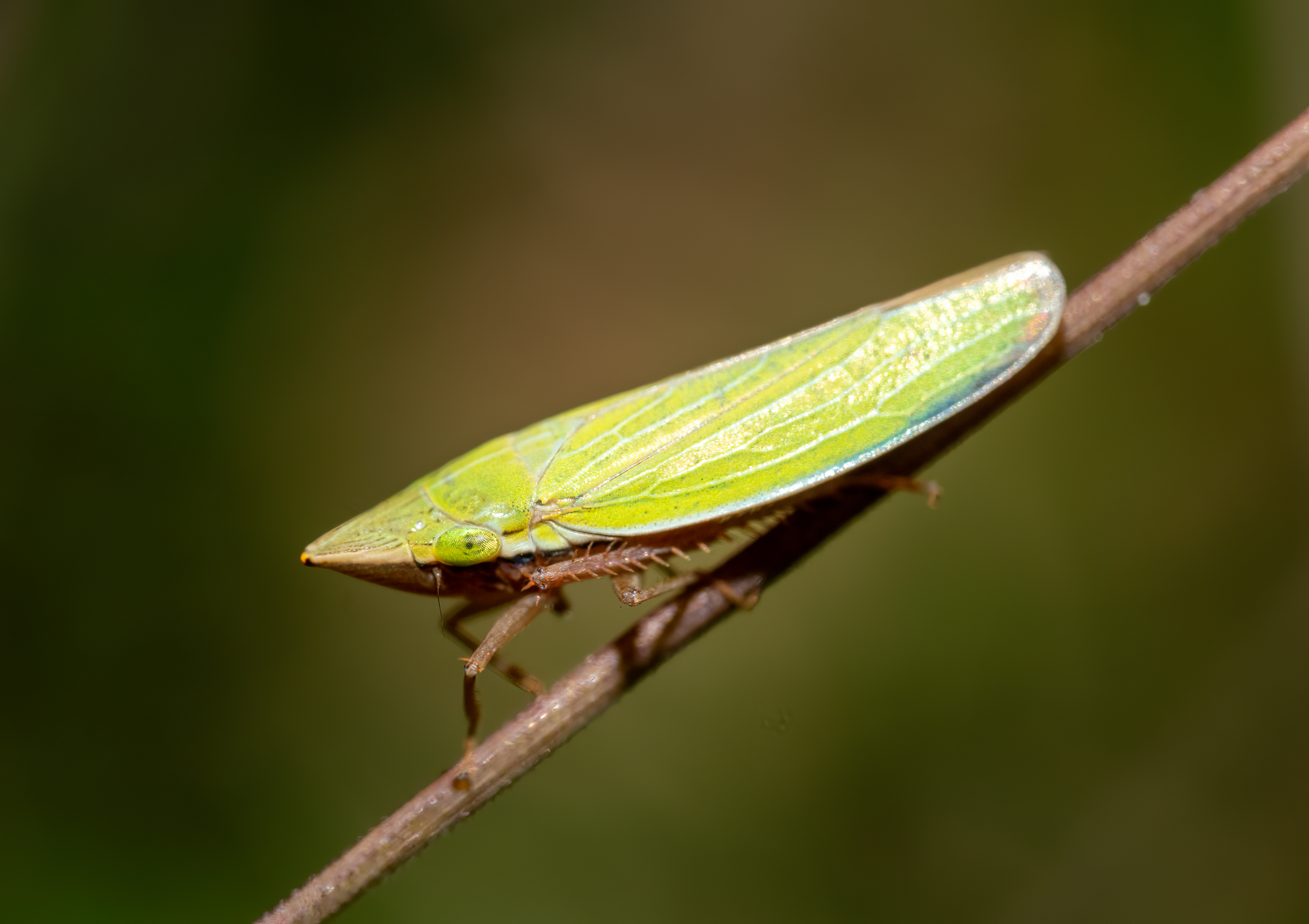
- D. constrica

Scientific classification
- Kingdom: Animalia
- Phylum: Arthropoda
- Class: Insecta
- Order: Hemiptera
- Suborder: Auchenorrhyncha
- Family: Cicadellidae
- Tribe: Cicadellini
- Genus: Draeculacephala; Ball, 1901

= Draeculacephala =

Genus of leafhoppers

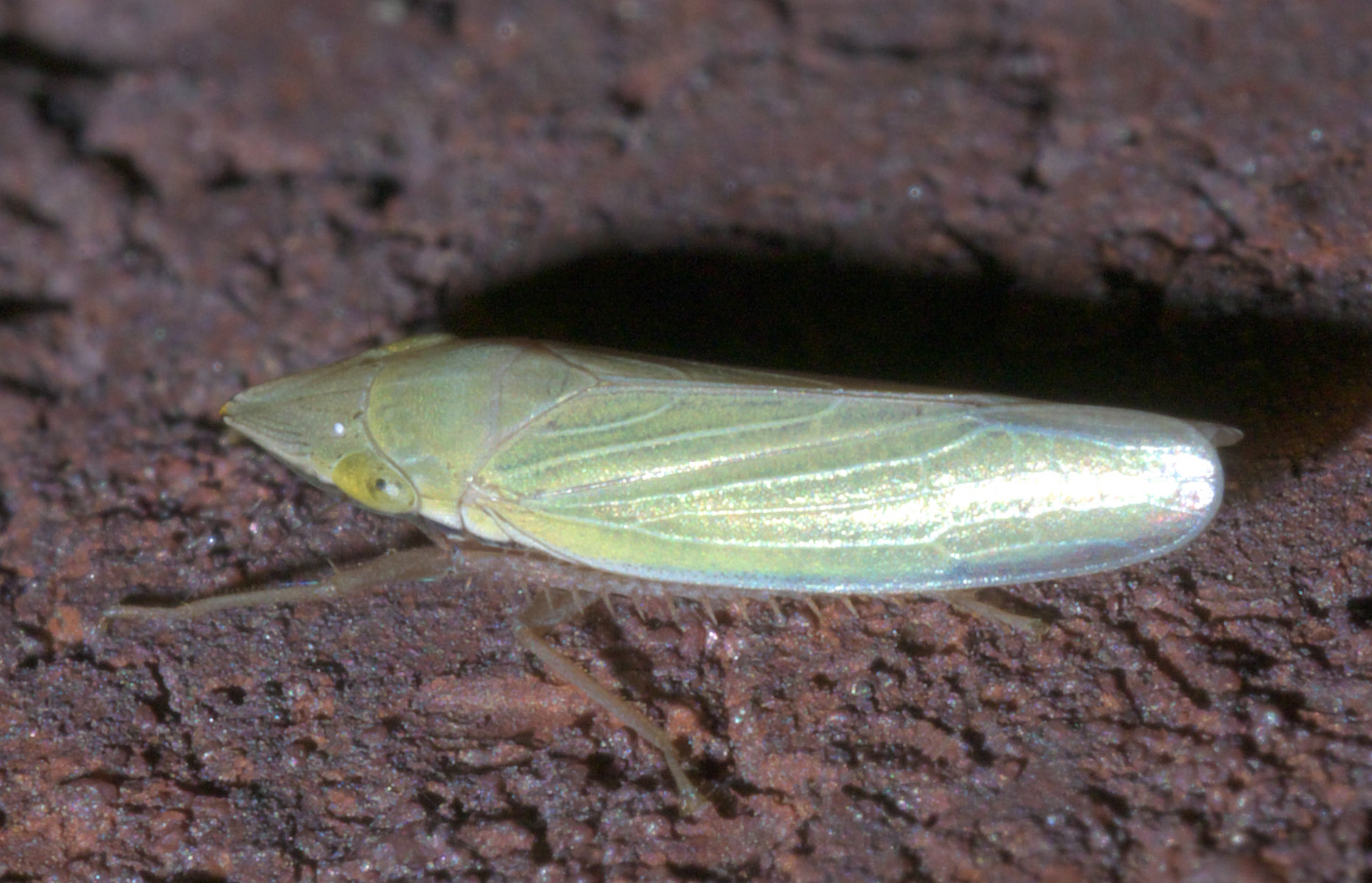
Sharpshooters, Draeculacephala

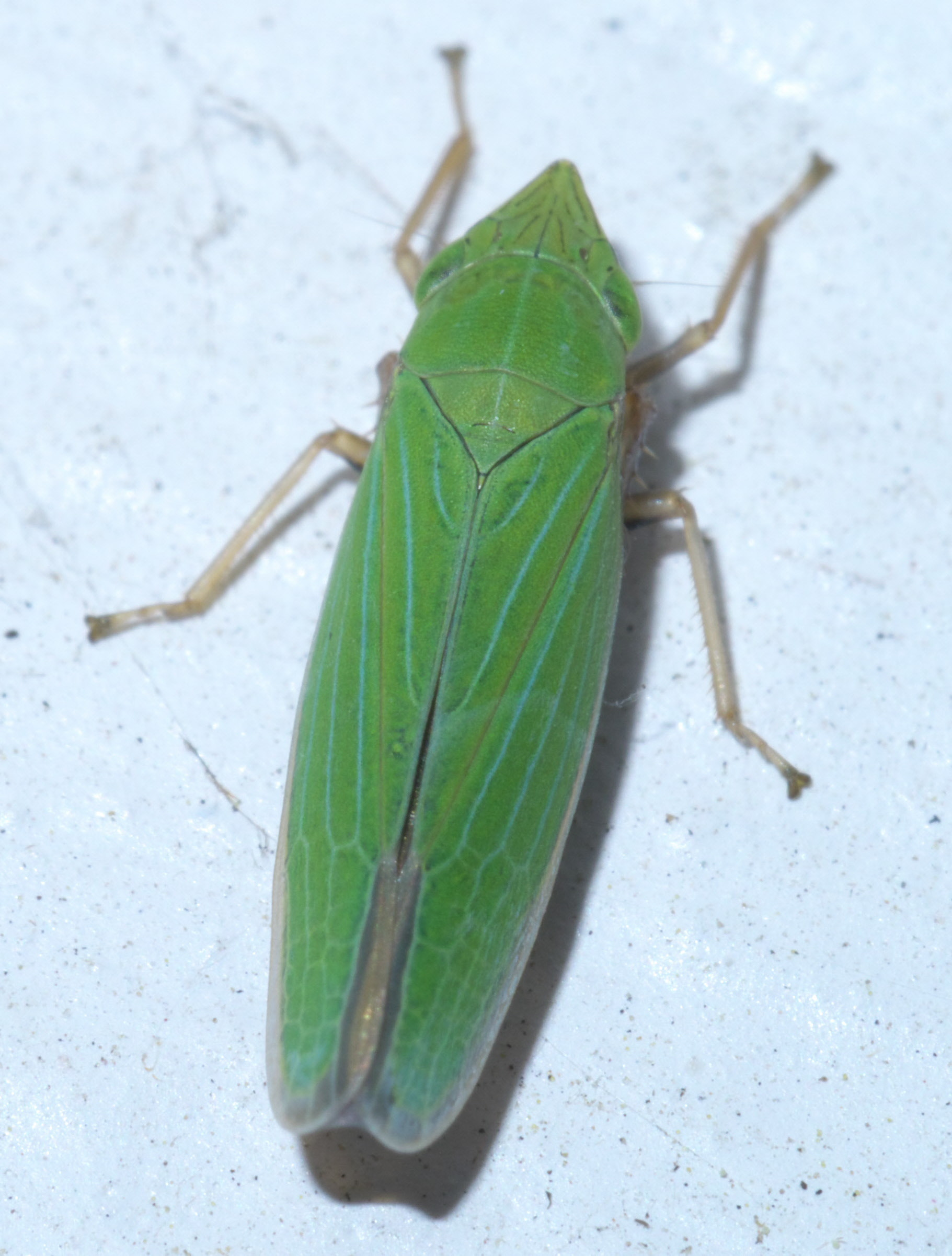
Sharpshooters, Draeculacephala

Draeculacephala is a genus of leafhoppers. It is one of the most common and widespread genera of leafhoppers in the New World. There are at least 25 described species in Draeculacephala.

The adults of most Draeculacephala species are green in color, although a few are straw colored. They are generally 6 to 11 mm in length, with a triangular head that projects forward to a point.

== Species ==
These 27 species belong to the genus Draeculacephala:

- Draeculacephala albipicta Dietrich, 1994^{c g}
- Draeculacephala angulifera Walker, 1851^{c g b}
- Draeculacephala antica Walker, 1851^{c g b}
- Draeculacephala balli Van Duzee, 1915^{c g b}
- Draeculacephala bradleyi Van Duzee, 1915^{c g b}
- Draeculacephala californica Davidson & Frazier, 1949^{c g}
- Draeculacephala clypeata Osborn, 1926^{c g}
- Draeculacephala constricta Davidson et DeLong, 1943^{c g b}
- Draeculacephala crassicornis Van Duzee, 1915^{c g b}
- Draeculacephala floridana Ball, 1901^{c g b}
- Draeculacephala inscripta Van Duzee, 1915^{c g b} (waterlettuce leafhopper)
- Draeculacephala manitobiana Ball, 1901^{b}
- Draeculacephala minerva Ball, 1927^{i c g b} (grass sharpshooter)
- Draeculacephala mollipes Say, 1840^{c g b} (watercress sharpshooter)
- Draeculacephala navicula Hamilton, 1985^{c g b}
- Draeculacephala noveboracensis Fitch, 1851^{c g b}
- Draeculacephala pagoda Ball, 1927^{c g}
- Draeculacephala paludosa Ball et China, 1933^{c g b}
- Draeculacephala portola Ball, 1927^{c g b}
- Draeculacephala prasina^{b}
- Draeculacephala producta Walker, 1851^{c g b}
- Draeculacephala robinsoni Hamilton, 1967^{c g b}
- Draeculacephala savannahae Hamilton, 1985^{c g b}
- Draeculacephala septemguttata Walker, 1851^{c g b}
- Draeculacephala soluta Gibson, 1919^{c g}
- Draeculacephala tucumanensis Dietrich, 1994^{c g}
- Draeculacephala youngi Dietrich, 1994^{c g}

Data sources: i = ITIS, c = Catalogue of Life, g = GBIF, b = Bugguide.net
