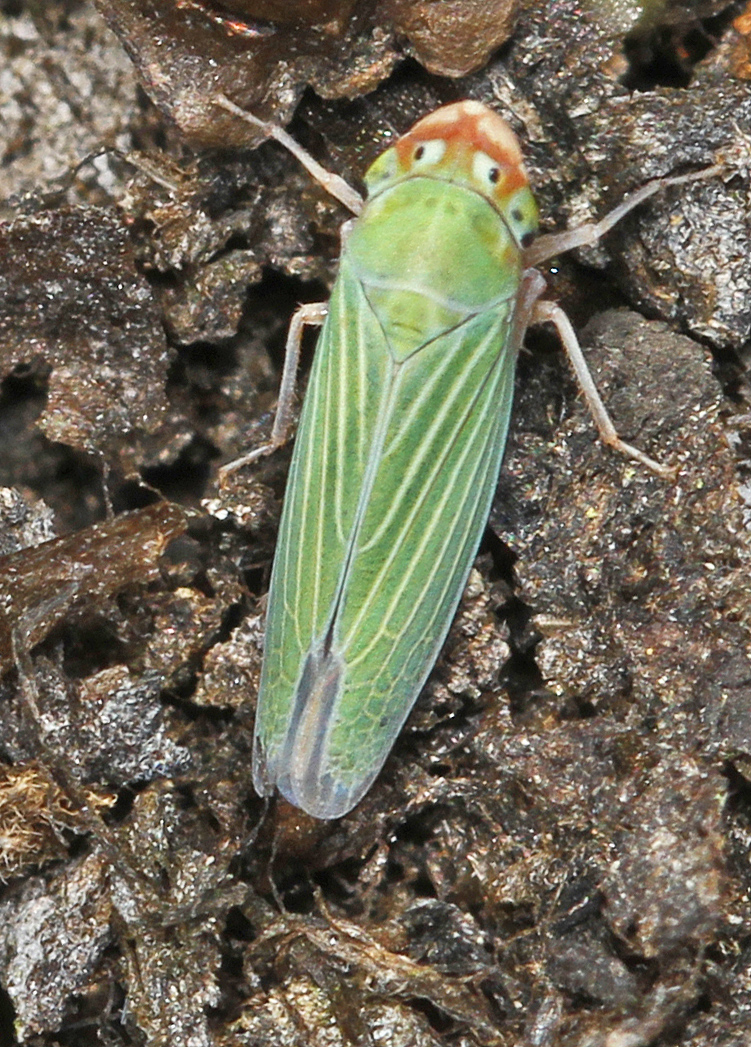
- Xyphon flaviceps

Scientific classification
- Kingdom: Animalia
- Phylum: Arthropoda
- Class: Insecta
- Order: Hemiptera
- Suborder: Auchenorrhyncha
- Family: Cicadellidae
- Tribe: Cicadellini
- Genus: Xyphon; Hamilton, 1985

= Xyphon =

Genus of leafhoppers

Xyphon is a genus of leafhoppers in the family Cicadellidae. There are at least seven described species in Xyphon.

== Species ==
- Xyphon flaviceps (Riley, 1880)^{c g b} (yellow-headed leafhopper)
- Xyphon fulgidum (Nottingham, 1932)^{c g}
- Xyphon gillettei (Ball, 1901)^{c g}
- Xyphon nudum (Nottingham, 1932)^{c g}
- Xyphon reticulatum Signoret, 1854^{c g b} (bermudagrass leafhopper)
- Xyphon spadice Catanach & Dietrich, 2013^{c g}
- Xyphon triguttatum (Nottingham)^{c g b}

Data sources: i = ITIS, c = Catalogue of Life, g = GBIF, b = Bugguide.net
