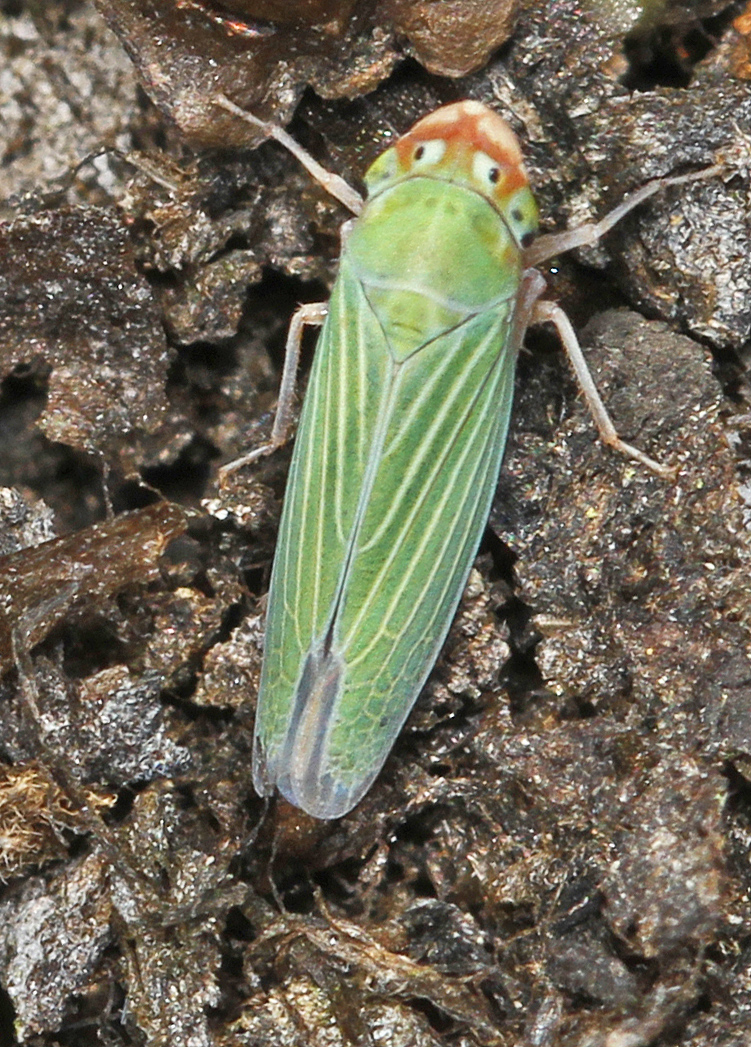

Scientific classification
- Kingdom: Animalia
- Phylum: Arthropoda
- Class: Insecta
- Order: Hemiptera
- Suborder: Auchenorrhyncha
- Family: Cicadellidae
- Genus: Xyphon
- Species: X. flaviceps

Binomial name
- Xyphon flaviceps (Riley, 1880)

= Xyphon flaviceps =

Species of true bug

Xyphon flaviceps, the yellow-headed leafhopper, is a species of sharpshooter in the family Cicadellidae.
