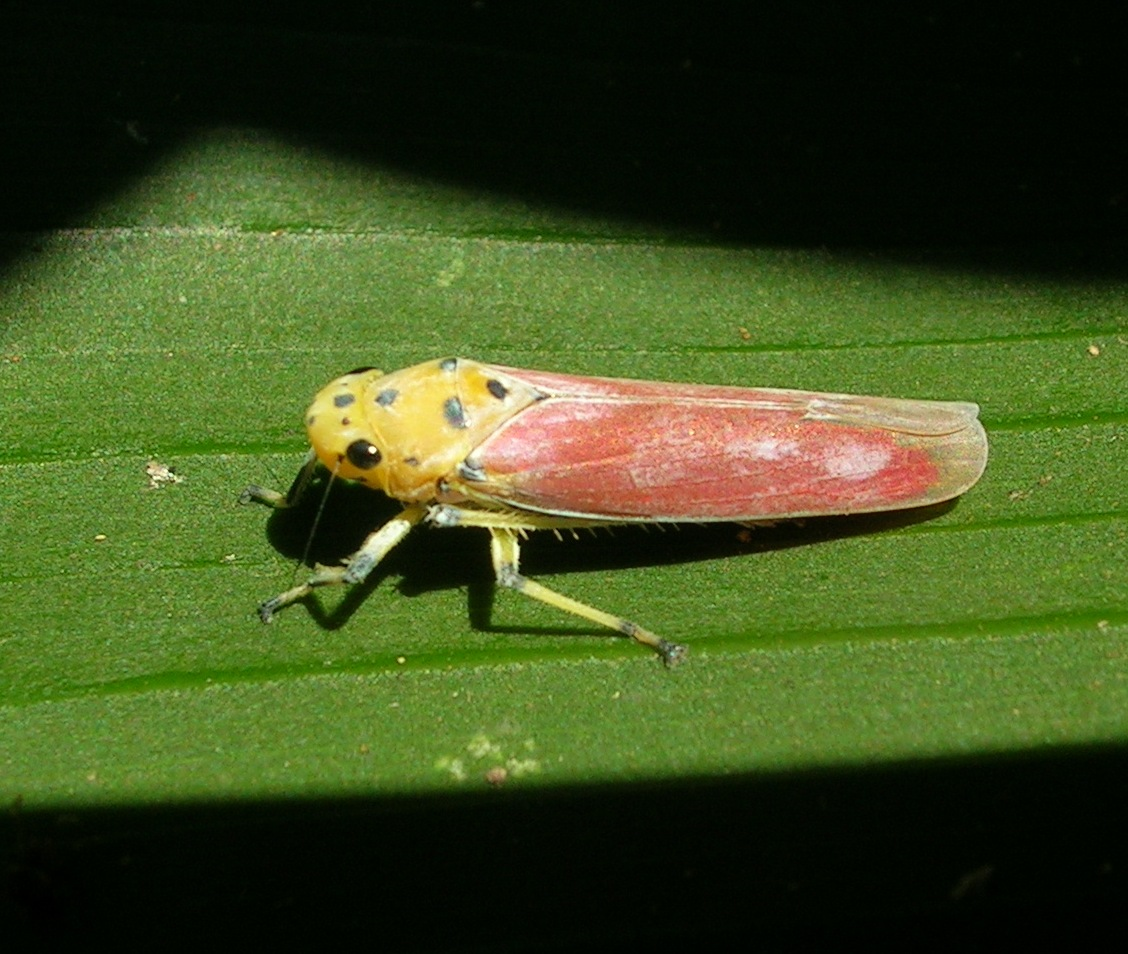
- A species from the Western Ghats

Scientific classification
- Domain: Eukaryota
- Kingdom: Animalia
- Phylum: Arthropoda
- Class: Insecta
- Order: Hemiptera
- Suborder: Auchenorrhyncha
- Family: Cicadellidae
- Tribe: Cicadellini
- Genus: Bothrogonia; Melichar, 1926

= Bothrogonia =

Genus of leafhoppers

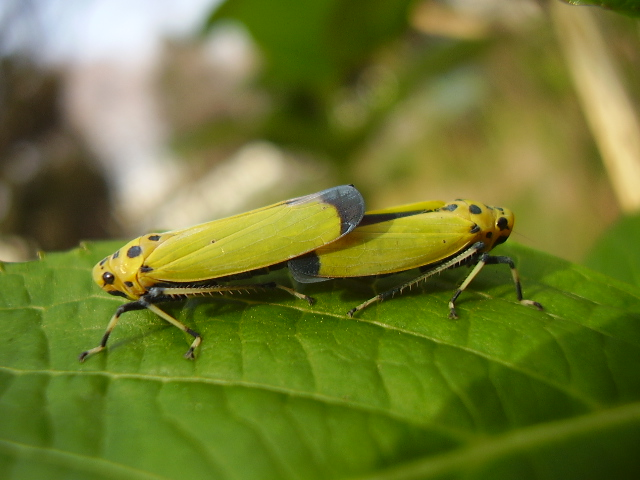
B. ferruginea

Bothrogonia is a genus of leafhoppers with a large number of species distributed across the Old World. They can be told apart from others in their tribe by the pattern of setae on the hind tibia.
