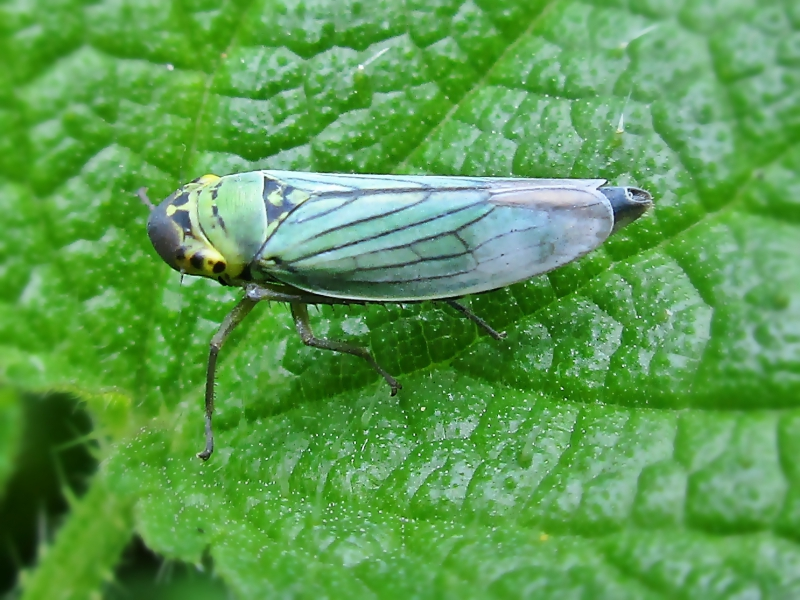
- Cicadella viridis (type species)

Scientific classification
- Kingdom: Animalia
- Phylum: Arthropoda
- Class: Insecta
- Order: Hemiptera
- Suborder: Auchenorrhyncha
- Family: Cicadellidae
- Subfamily: Cicadellinae; Latreille, 1825

= Cicadellinae =

Subfamily of leafhoppers

Cicadellinae is a leafhopper subfamily, currently (2025) containing five tribes.

== Tribes and genera ==
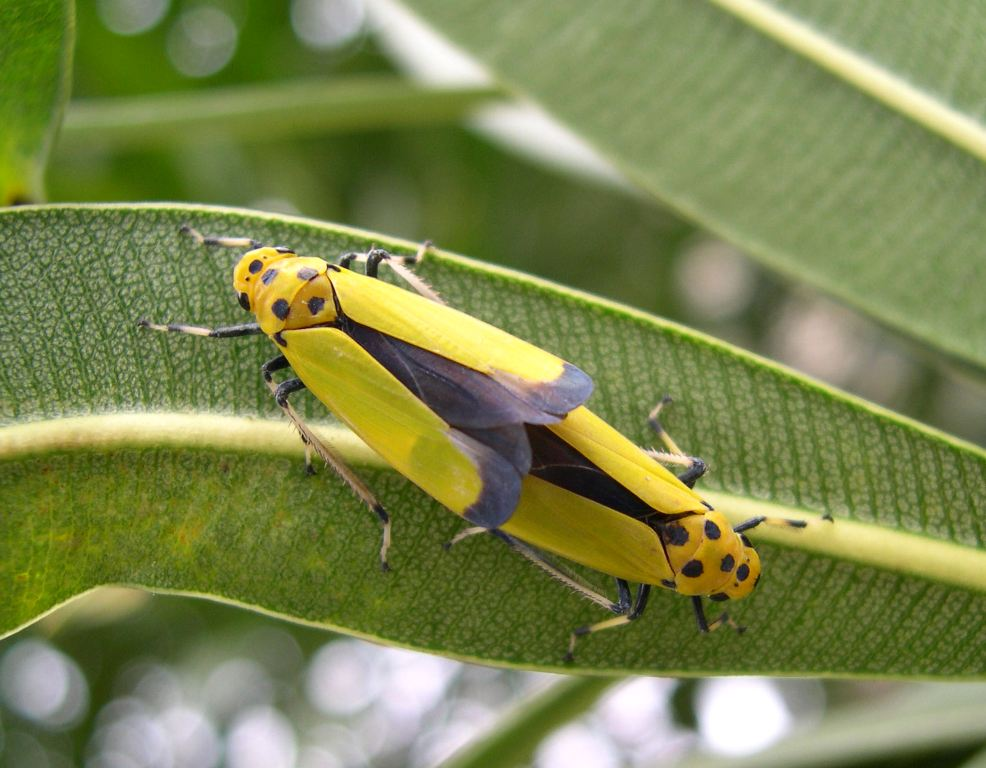
Mating pair of Bothrogonia ferruginea, known as tsumaguro-ōyokobai in Japan

The World Auchenorrhyncha Database includes:

Cicadellini Latreille, 1825

Selected genera:

- Bothrogonia
- Cicadella
- Cofana
- Graphocephala

Makilingiini Evans, 1947

1. Makilingia Baker, 1914

Phereurhinini Kramer, 1976

1. Clydacha Melichar, 1926
2. Dayoungia Kramer, 1976
3. Phereurhinus Jacobi, 1905

Proconiini Stål, 1869 (Sharpshooters)

Selected genera:

- Homalodisca
- Zyzzogeton

Tungurahualini Dietrich, 2011

1. Ilyapa Dietrich, 2011
2. Tungurahuala Kramer, 1965

Incertae sedis

- Homalogoniella Melichar, 1924
- Others (under review)
