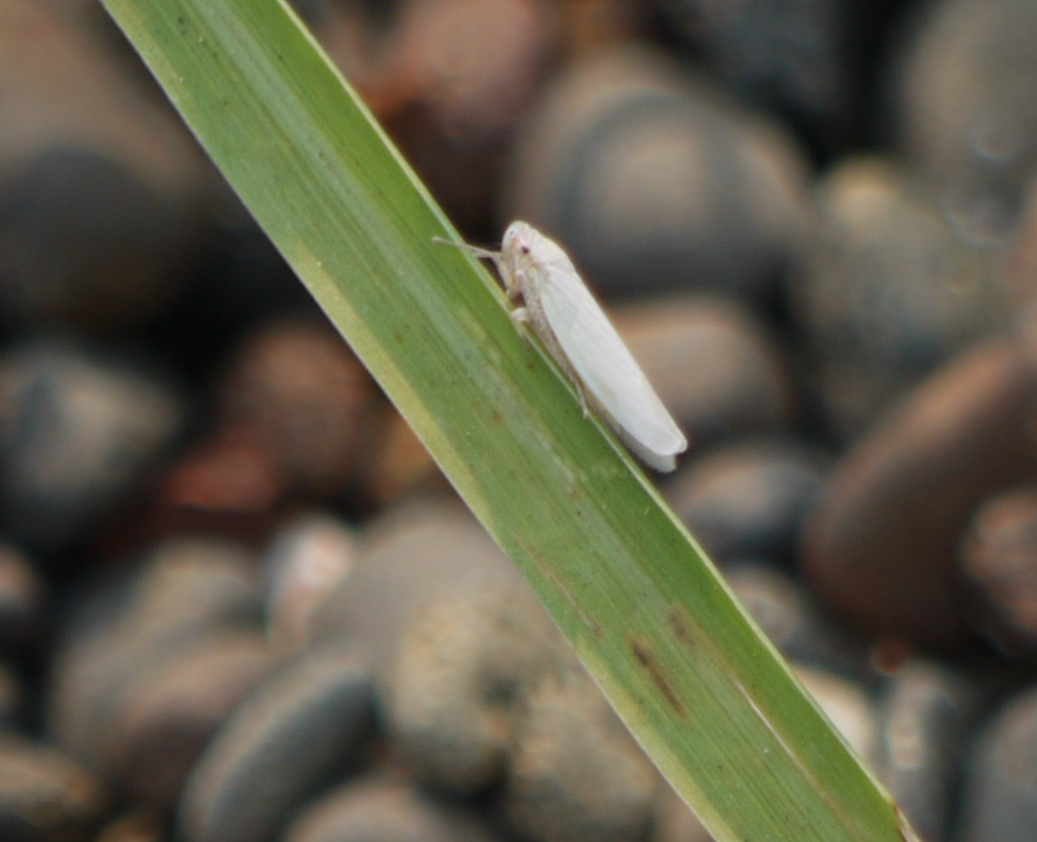
- Cofana sp., India

Scientific classification
- Domain: Eukaryota
- Kingdom: Animalia
- Phylum: Arthropoda
- Class: Insecta
- Order: Hemiptera
- Suborder: Auchenorrhyncha
- Family: Cicadellidae
- Tribe: Cicadellini
- Genus: Cofana; Melichar, 1926

Type species
- Tettigonia quinquenotata (Stål, 1870)

Synonyms
- Yasumatsuus Ishihara, 1971; Cojana Linnavuori, 1979

= Cofana =

Genus of leafhoppers

Cofana is a genus of leafhoppers belonging to the family Cicadellidae. Cofana species can be often found in grass habitats and in rice fields. Some species have been recorded on Dinochloa scandens (Poaceae). The genus Cofana is distinguished by their male genital morphology, with an aedeagus lacking paraphyses and basal processes. The hindwing lacks vein R2+3. Species in the genus are found in Africa, Asia, and Australia.

== Species ==
Some species of this genus are:

- Cofana albida Walker, 1851
- Cofana eburnea Walker, 1857
- Cofana fuscivenis Bergroth, 1894
- Cofana gelbata Young, 1986
- Cofana grisea Evans, 1955
- Cofana hoogstraali Young, 1979
- Cofana jedarfa Young, 1979
- Cofana karachiensis Ara & Ahmed, 1988
- Cofana karjatensis Ramakrishnan, 1985
- Cofana lata Young, 1979
- Cofana lineatus Distant, 1908
- Cofana maai Young, 1979
- Cofana medleri Young, 1979
- Cofana nigrilinea Stål, 1870
- Cofana perkinsi Kirkaldy, 1906
- Cofana polaris Young, 1979
- Cofana separata Young, 1979
- Cofana sotoi Young, 1979
- Cofana spectra Distant, 1908
- Cofana subvirescens Stål, 1870
- Cofana trilobata Meshram & Ramamurthy, 2014
- Cofana unimaculata Signoret, 1854
- Cofana yasumatsui Young, 1979
- Cofana yukawai Kamitani, 2004
