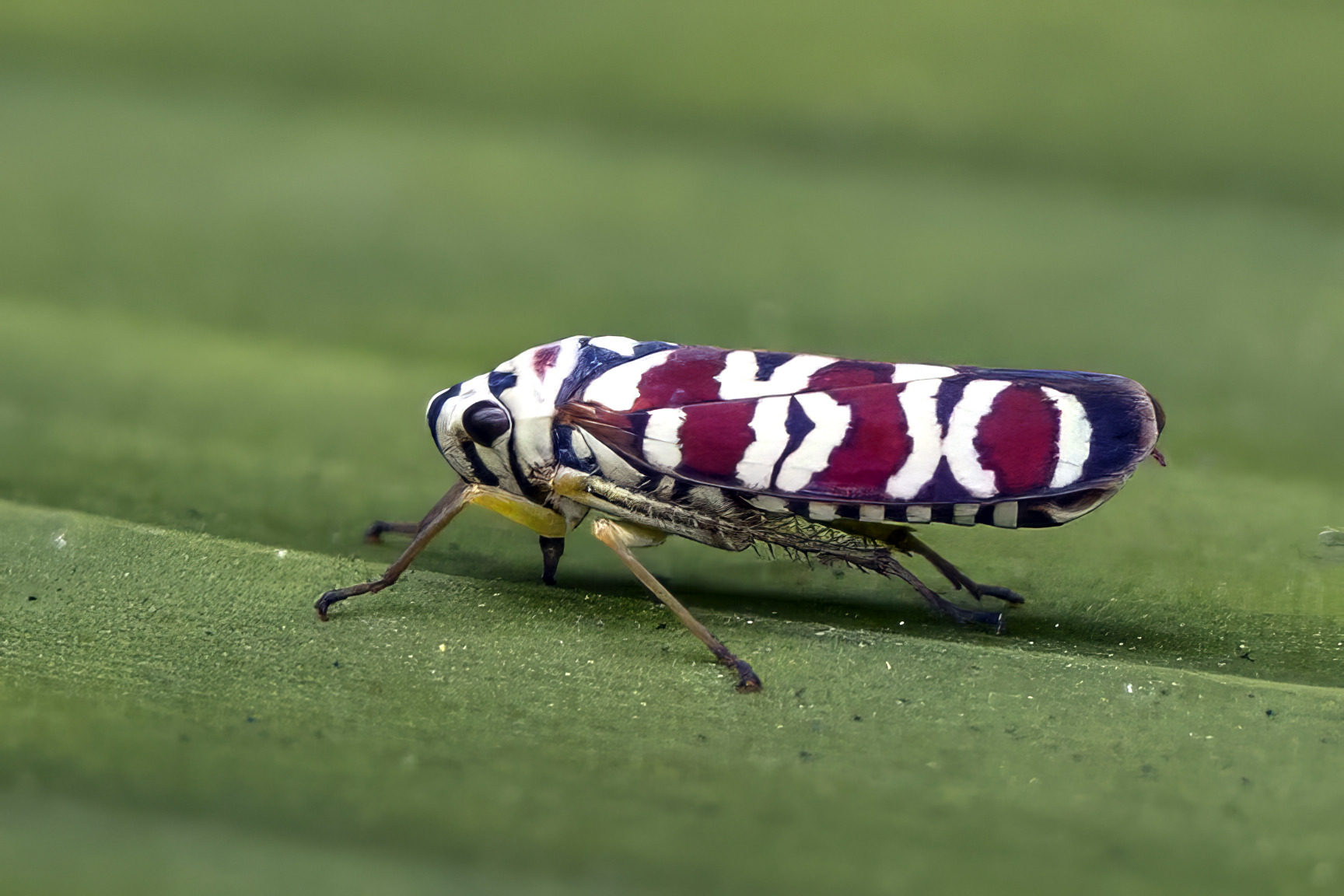
- Agrosoma cruciata in Colombia

Scientific classification
- Kingdom: Animalia
- Phylum: Arthropoda
- Clade: Pancrustacea
- Class: Insecta
- Order: Hemiptera
- Suborder: Auchenorrhyncha
- Family: Cicadellidae
- Subfamily: Cicadellinae
- Tribe: Cicadellini; Latreille, 1802

Genera
- Include: Agrosoma Medler, 1960; Bhandara Distant, 1908; Bothrogonia Melichar, 1926; Cicadella Latreille, 1817; Cofana Melichar, 1926; Draeculacephala Ball, 1901; Graphocephala Van Duzee, 1916; Ladoffa Young, 1977; Onega Distant, 1908; Sibovia China, 1927; Tettigoniella Jacobi, 1904; Tylozygus Fieber, 1865; Xyphon Hamilton, 1985

= Cicadellini =

Tribe of true bugs

Cicadellini is a tribe of leafhoppers in the family Cicadellidae. There are several thousand species described in the tribe Cicadellini.

== Genera ==
The following are included in BioLib.cz:

1. Abothrogo Yang, 1980
2. Abothrogonia Yang, 1980
3. Acopsis Amyot & Serville, 1843
4. Acrulogonia Young, 1977
5. Acumada Young, 1986
6. Agrosoma Medler, 1960
7. Aguahua Young, 1977
8. Aguana Melichar, 1926
9. Aguatala Young, 1977
10. Alahana Melichar, 1926
11. Albiniana Cavichioli, 1996
12. Allogonia Melichar, 1926
13. Allonolla Young, 1977
14. Alocha Melichar, 1926
15. Amalfia Melichar, 1924
16. Ambigonalia Young, 1977
17. Amblyscarta Stål, 1869
18. Amblyscartidia Young, 1977
19. Amphigonalia Young, 1977
20. Amplimada Young, 1986
21. Anacofana Young, 1986
22. Anagonalia Young, 1986
23. Anatkina Young, 1986
24. Apogonalia Evans, 1947
25. Apulia Distant, 1908
26. Arragsia Young, 1986
27. Aspilodora Melichar, 1926
28. Ateloguina Young, 1986
29. Atkinsoniella Distant, 1908
30. Aurigoniella Takiya, Mejdalani & Felix, 2001
31. Aurogonalia Young, 1977
32. Backhoffella Schmidt, 1928
33. Balacha Melichar, 1926
34. Baleja Melichar, 1926
35. Barbinolla Young, 1977
36. Begonalia Young, 1977
37. Beirneola Young, 1977
38. Bhandara Distant, 1908
39. Bharagonalia Young, 1986
40. Bharata Distant, 1918
41. Bhooria Distant, 1908
42. Biprocessa Meng & Yang, 2015
43. Bornatka Young, 1986
44. Borogonalia Young, 1977
45. Bothrogonia Melichar, 1926
46. Breviguina Young, 1986
47. Bubacua Young, 1977
48. Bucephalogonia Melichar, 1926
49. Caldwelliola Young, 1977
50. Camaija Young, 1977
51. Campecha Melichar, 1924
52. Capcoana Young, 1986
53. Caragonalia Young, 1977
54. Caragonia Takiya, Cavichioli & Mejdalani, 2003
55. Cardioscarta Melichar, 1926
56. Caribovia Young, 1977
57. Castanoguina Young, 1986
58. Catagonalia Evans, 1947
59. Catenocola Young, 1986
60. Cavichia Nemésio, 2006
61. Cavichiana Mejdalani, Quintas, Carvalho & Takiya, 2014
62. Caxia Melichar, 1924
63. Cephalogonalia Evans, 1947
64. Chichahua Young, 1977
65. Chlorogonalia Young, 1977
66. Cibra Young, 1977
67. Cicadella Latreille, 1817
68. Ciminius Metcalf & Bruner, 1936
69. Cinerogonalia Young, 1977
70. Clinogonalia Young, 1986
71. Clypelliana Cavichioli, 1998
72. Cofana Melichar, 1926
73. Colliguina Young, 1986
74. Conogonia Breddin, 1903
75. Conoguinula Young, 1986
76. Coronigonalia Young, 1977
77. Coronigoniella Young, 1977
78. Crossogonalia Young, 1977
79. Cubrasa Young, 1977
80. Cuitlana Young, 1977
81. Cyclogonia Melichar, 1926
82. Daedaloscarta Cavichioli & Takiya, 2012
83. Dasmeusa Melichar, 1926
84. Decua Oman, 1949
85. Demadana Young, 1986
86. Derogonia Melichar, 1926
87. Diedrocephala Spinola, 1850
88. Dilobopterus Signoret, 1850
89. Diodontophorus Huh & Kwon, 1994
90. Draeculacephala Ball, 1901
91. Ehagua Melichar, 1926
92. Eldarbala Young, 1977
93. Emadiana Young, 1986
94. Erragonalia Young, 1986
95. Erythrogonia Melichar, 1926
96. Exogonia Melichar, 1926
97. Ferrariana Young, 1977
98. Fingeriana Cavichioli, 2003
99. Fonsecaiulus Young, 1977
100. Fusigonalia Young, 1977
101. Garguina Young, 1986
102. Geitogonalia Young, 1977
103. Gillonella Nielson & Godoy, 1995
104. Gorgonalia Young, 1977
105. Graphocephala Van Duzee, 1916
106. Graphogonalia Young, 1977
107. Graptoguina Young, 1986
108. Griveaudana Young, 1986
109. Guineotetta Young, 1986
110. Gununga Melichar, 1914
111. Gunungidia Young, 1986
112. Hadria Metcalf & Bruner, 1936
113. Hangapa Young, 1986
114. Hanshumba Young, 1977
115. Helochara Fitch, 1851
116. Helocharina Melichar, 1926
117. Heteroguina Young, 1986
118. Hortensia Metcalf & Bruner, 1936
119. Immadellana Young, 1986
120. Inuyana Young, 1977
121. Iragua Melichar, 1926
122. Ishidaella Matsumura, 1912
123. Isogonalia Young, 1977
124. Jakrama Young, 1977
125. Janastana Young, 1977
126. Jeepiulus Cavichioli, 2000
127. Jozima Young, 1977
128. Juliaca Melichar, 1926
129. Kapateira Young, 1977
130. Kepulana Young, 1986
131. Kikuchiella Kato, 1932
132. Kogigonalia Young, 1977
133. Kolla Distant, 1908
134. Ladoffa Young, 1977
135. Lanceoscarta Takiya & Cavichioli, 2005
136. Laneola Young, 1977
137. Latiguina Young, 1986
138. Lautereria Young, 1977
139. Lebaja Young, 1977
140. Lebaziella Cavichioli, 2010
141. Lissoscarta Stål, 1869
142. Luzoniana Metcalf, 1953
143. Macugonalia Young, 1977
144. Macumada Young, 1986
145. Macunolla Young, 1977
146. Madagena Young, 1986
147. Madanata Young, 1986
148. Madaura Young, 1986
149. Madessina Young, 1986
150. Madicola Young, 1986
151. Madranga Young, 1986
152. Madriscula Young, 1986
153. Madumbra Young, 1986
154. Maguangua Melichar, 1926
155. Mahaja Young, 1986
156. Malgasicola Young, 1986
157. Malgasiella Young, 1986
158. Malissiana Evans, 1954
159. Manzutus Oman, 1949
160. Mareja Melichar, 1926
161. Mascarenotettix Evans, 1954
162. Medlerola Young, 1977
163. Melanguina Young, 1986
164. Mesogonia Melichar, 1926
165. Metascarta Melichar, 1926
166. Miarogonalia Young, 1977
167. Microgoniella Melichar, 1926
168. Mimiya Young, 1986
169. Miscana Yang & Zhang, 2001
170. Monomada Young, 1986
171. Moruloguina Young, 1986
172. Mucrometopia Melichar, 1925
173. Naltaca Young, 1977
174. Namsangia Distant, 1908
175. Nanatka Young, 1986
176. Nannogonalia Young, 1977
177. Neiva Melichar, 1925
178. Neodayoungia Mejdalani, 1994
179. Neohadria Freytag, 2007
180. Nielsonia Young, 1977
181. Nitidoguina Young, 1986
182. Oeogonalia Young, 1977
183. Onega Distant, 1908
184. Oragua Melichar, 1926
185. Orechona Melichar, 1926
186. Orianajea Young, 1986
187. Ortega Melichar, 1924
188. Pachitea Melichar, 1926
189. Paguinapua Young, 1986
190. Palingonalia Young, 1977
191. Pamplona Melichar, 1926
192. Pamplonoidea Young, 1977
193. Paracatua Melichar, 1926
194. Paragonalia Evans, 1947
195. Parahadria Freytag, 2007
196. Parasubrasaca Mejdalani & Cavichioli, 2013
197. Parathona Melichar, 1926
198. Paratkina Young, 1986
199. Paratubana Young, 1977
200. Parinaeota Melichar, 1926
201. Paromenia Melichar, 1926
202. Pawiloma Young, 1977
203. Pegogonia Young, 1977
204. Pelaguina Young, 1986
205. Pisachoides Distant, 1914
206. Platygonia Melichar, 1925
207. Plerogonalia Young, 1977
208. Plesiommata Provancher, 1889
209. Plummerella DeLong, 1942
210. Poecilocarda Metcalf, 1952
211. Poeciloscarta Stål, 1869
212. Polisanella Melichar, 1926
213. Poochara Stål, 1869
214. Processina Yang, Deitz & Li, 2005
215. Prodigiella Pecly, Quintas, Domahovski, Cavichioli & Mejdalani, 2024
216. Punahuana Young, 1977
217. Ramosulus Young, 1977
218. Resimaguina Young, 1986
219. Rhopalogonia Melichar, 1926
220. Roguina Young, 1986
221. Ronjpelana Young, 1986
222. Rotigonalia Young, 1977
223. Ruppeliana Young, 1977
224. Sailerana Young, 1977
225. Schildola Young, 1977
226. Schistogonalia Young, 1977
227. Scopogonalia Young, 1977
228. Scoposcartula Young, 1977
229. Seasogonia Young, 1986
230. Segonalia Young, 1977
231. Selvitsa Young, 1977
232. Serpa Distant, 1908
233. Sibovia China, 1927
234. Sisimitalia Young, 1977
235. Sochinsogonia Young, 1986
236. Sochinsogonioidia McKamey, Xue & Zhang, 2014
237. Sofiella Domahovski, Alasmar & Cavichioli, 2023
238. Sonesimia Young, 1977
239. Soosiulus Young, 1977
240. Sphaeropogonia Breddin, 1901
241. Sphinctogonia Breddin, 1901
242. Sphinctogoniella Meng, Yang & Zhou, 2016
243. Spinagonalia Cavichioli, 2008
244. Stehlikiana Young, 1977
245. Stenatkina Young, 1986
246. Stephanolla Young, 1977
247. Strictogonia Melichar, 1926
248. Subrasaca Young, 1977
249. Syncharina Young, 1977
250. Tacora Melichar, 1926
251. Tahuampa Young, 1977
252. Tantogonalia Young, 1977
253. Teleogonia Melichar, 1924
254. Teloguina Young, 1986
255. Tettigellita Young, 1986
256. Tettisama Young, 1977
257. Tettiselva Young, 1977
258. Tipuana Melichar, 1926
259. Tlagonalia Young, 1977
260. Torresabela Young, 1977
261. Tortigonalia Young, 1977
262. Trachygonalia Young, 1977
263. Trachyguina Young, 1986
264. Trichogonia Breddin, 1901
265. Tsarata Young, 1986
266. Tubiga Young, 1977
267. Tuguinana Young, 1986
268. Tylozygus Fieber, 1865
269. Unguinana Young, 1986
270. Uperogonalia Young, 1977
271. Versigonalia Young, 1977
272. Vidanoana Young, 1977
273. Willeiana Young, 1977
274. Wolfniana Cavichioli, 2000
275. Wutingia Melichar, 1926
276. Xenogonalia Young, 1977
277. Xyphon Hamilton, 1985
278. Zaruma Melichar, 1926

== Gallery ==
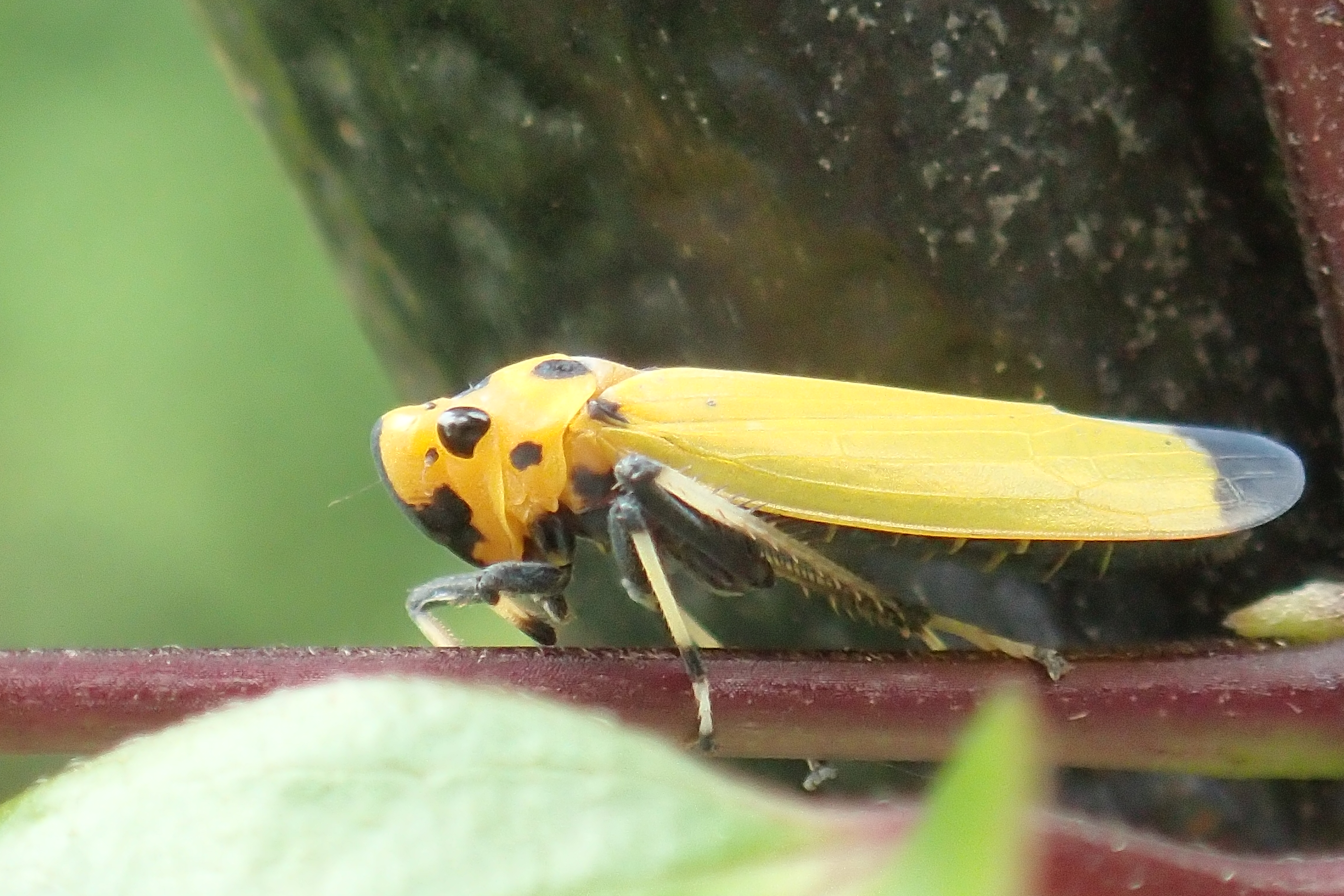
Bothrogonia ferruginea

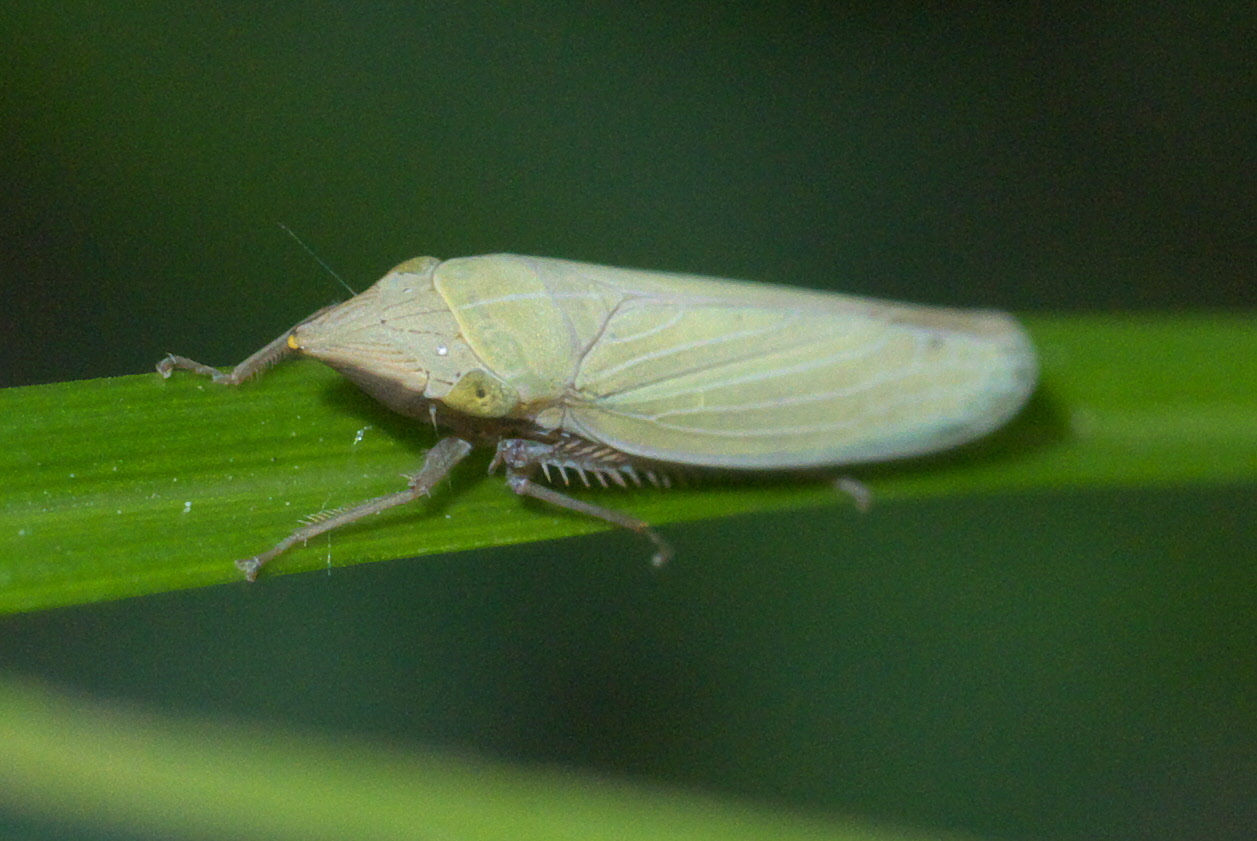
Draeculacephala

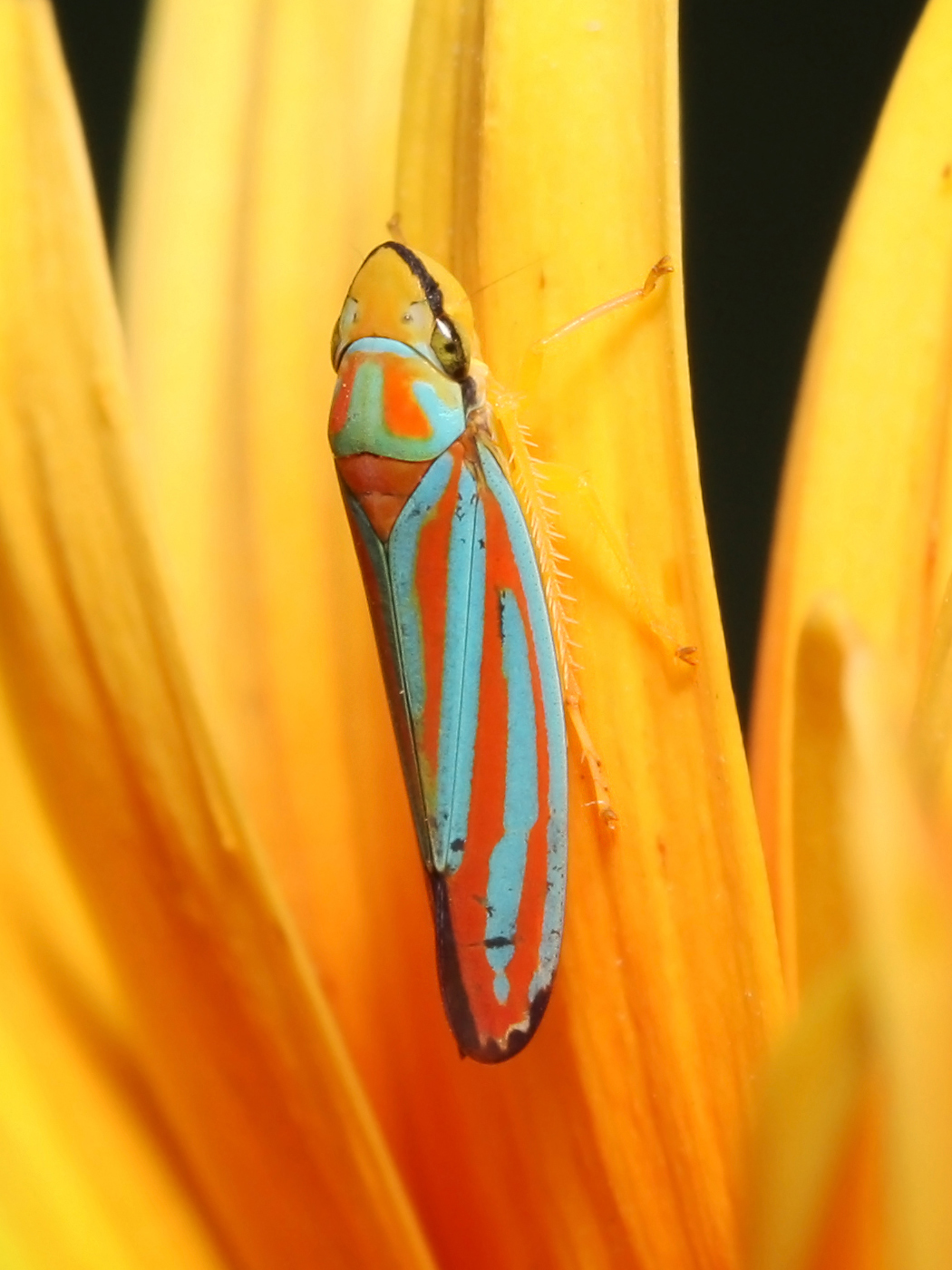
Graphocephala coccinea

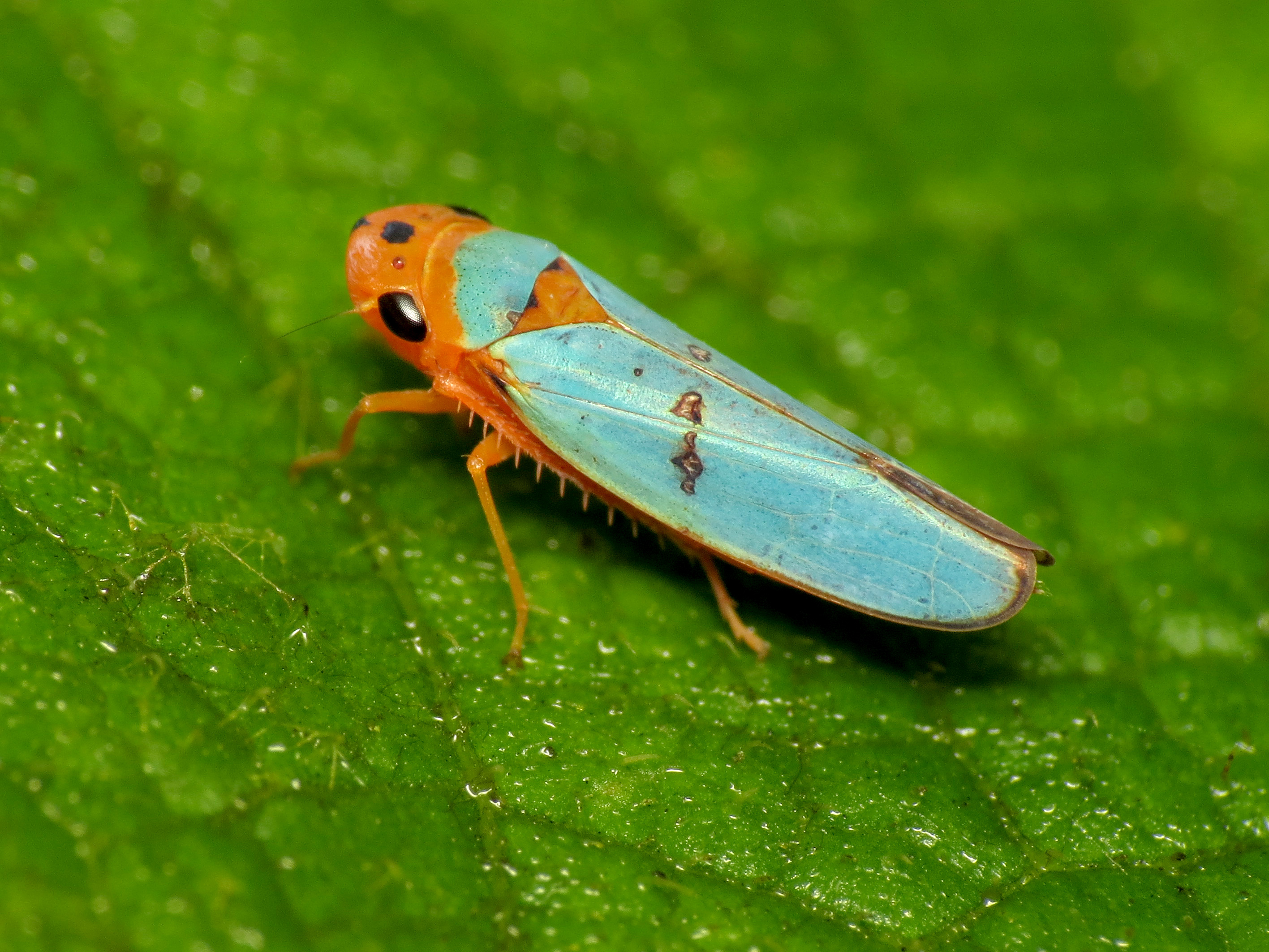
Macunolla ventralis

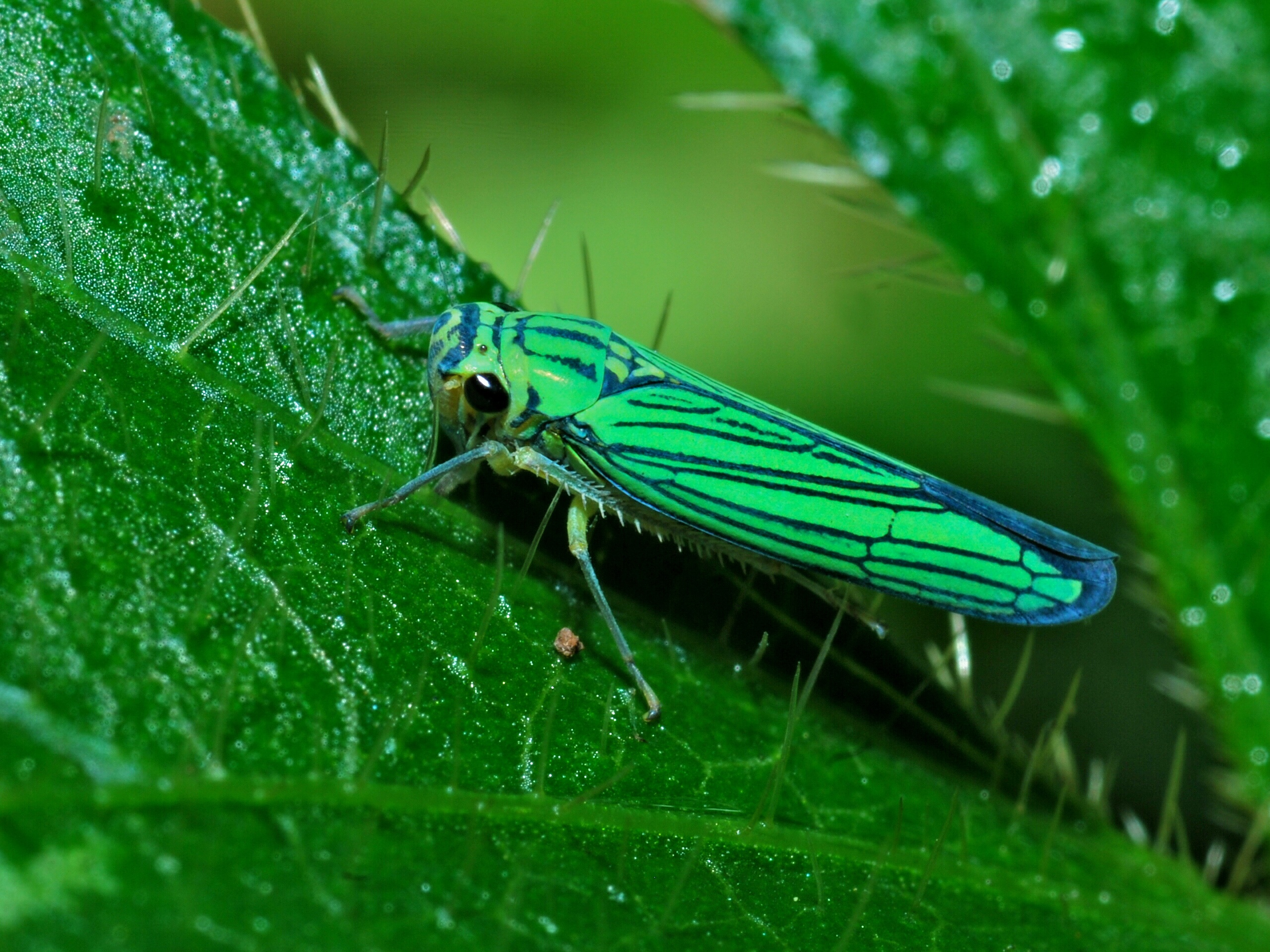
Tettigoniella nigrinervis

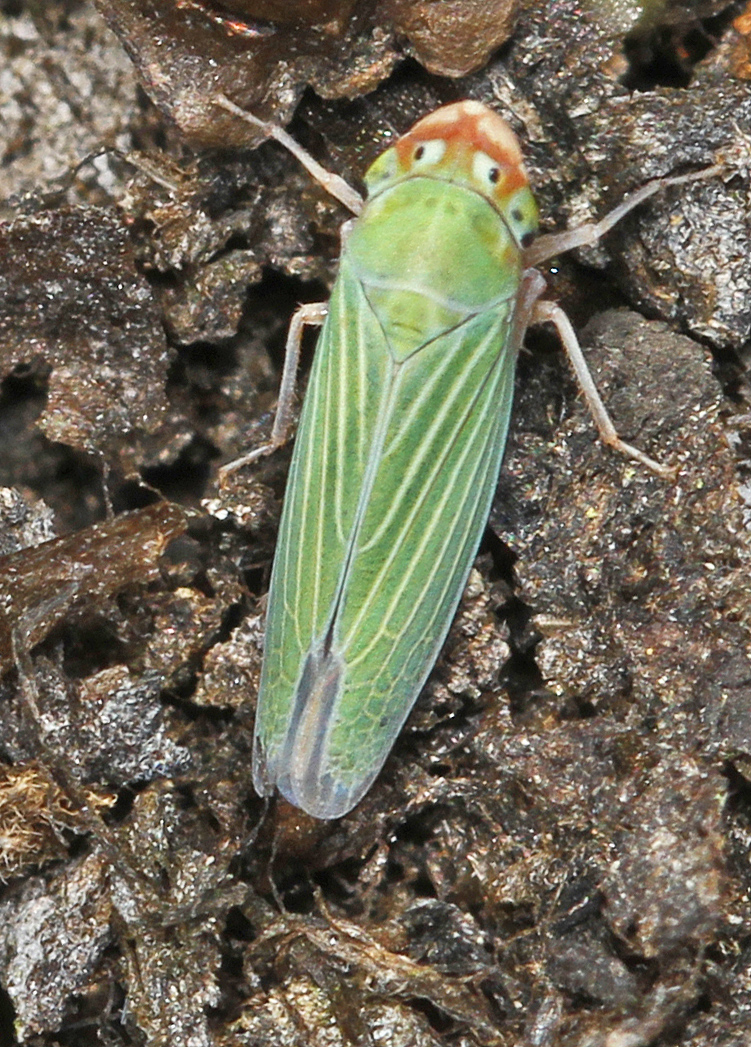
Xyphon flaviceps
