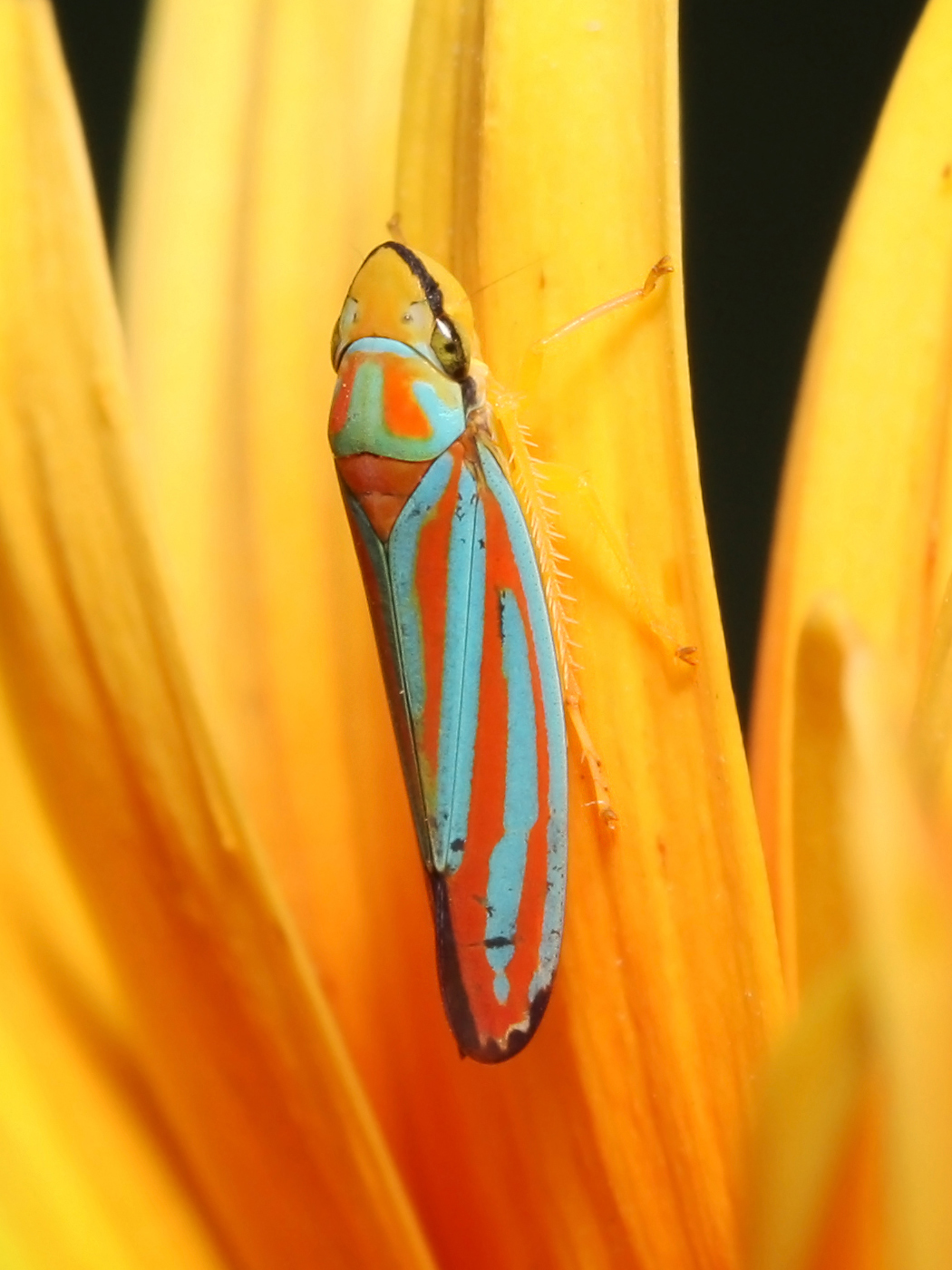

Scientific classification
- Kingdom: Animalia
- Phylum: Arthropoda
- Clade: Pancrustacea
- Class: Insecta
- Order: Hemiptera
- Suborder: Auchenorrhyncha
- Family: Cicadellidae
- Genus: Graphocephala
- Species: G. coccinea

Binomial name
- Graphocephala coccinea (Forster, 1771)

Synonyms
- Cicada coccinea Forster, 1771; Tettigonia quadrivittata Say, 1830; Tettigonia picta Walker, 1851; Tettigonia teliformis Walker, 1851; Tettigonia idonea Fowler, 1900

= Graphocephala coccinea =

Species of true bug

Graphocephala coccinea is a meadow and woodland-dwelling species of brightly colored leafhopper native to North and Central America, from Canada south to Panama. Common names include candy-striped leafhopper, red-banded leafhopper, scarlet-and-green leafhopper, red-and-blue leafhopper, and sharpshooter.

Adults measure 6.7–8.4 mm in length and have vivid blue (or green) and red (or orange-red) stripes on their wings and the top of their thorax combined with bright yellow coloration on their head, legs, abdomen, and elsewhere.

Leafhoppers feed on plant sap with the aid of specialized mouthparts.

== Pierce's disease ==
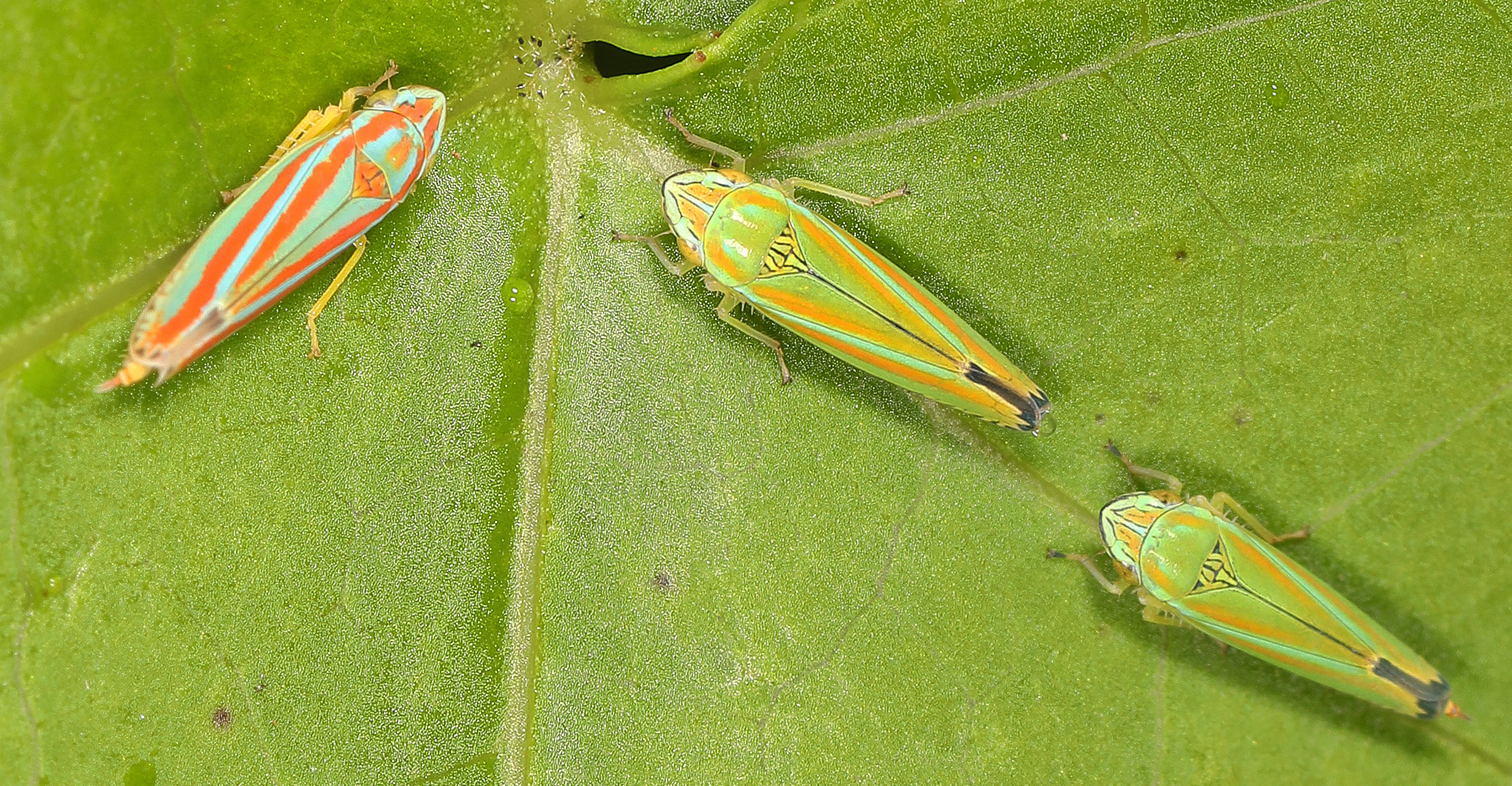
G. coccinea (left), G. versuta (right)

G. coccinea has been identified as one of several leafhopper species that is a vector in leaf scorch caused by the gammaproteobacteria Xylella fastidiosa ("Pierce's disease"). X. fastidiosa is responsible for the decline of certain woody plants such as elm, oak, and other ornamental trees. According to a research entomologist at the United States National Arboretum, "An understanding of the transmission of this bacterium by insect vectors is economically important because there is neither any known effective therapy for infected trees and shrubs nor a strategy for preventing infection." In California they damage valuable crops and in Germany they are a nuisance to people sitting under trees in public parks.

== Subspecies ==
At least three subspecies of G. coccinea have been named: G. coccinea confluenta, G. coccinea punctata, and G. coccinea sambuci (all Olsen 1918).

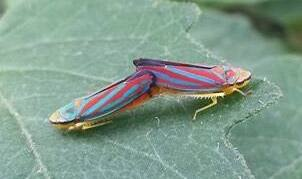
Mating

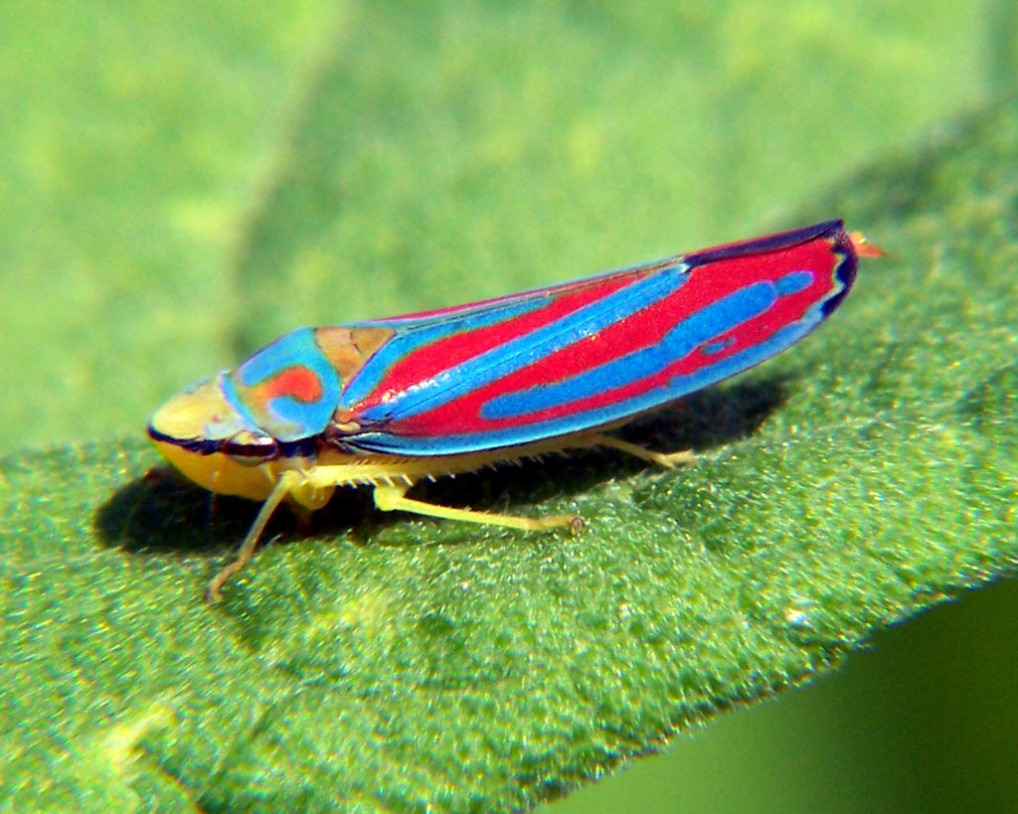
