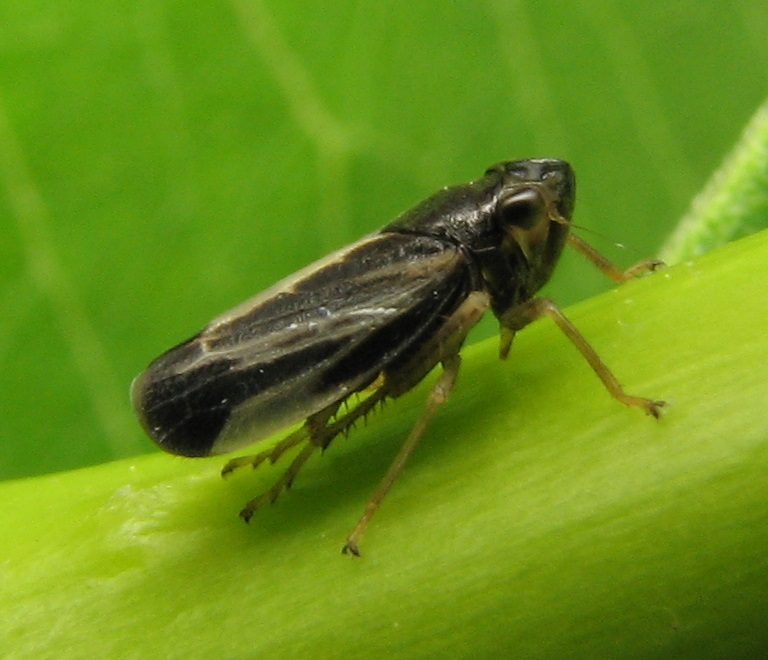
- Evacanthus nigramericanus male

Scientific classification
- Domain: Eukaryota
- Kingdom: Animalia
- Phylum: Arthropoda
- Class: Insecta
- Order: Hemiptera
- Suborder: Auchenorrhyncha
- Family: Cicadellidae
- Subfamily: Evacanthinae
- Tribe: Evacanthini
- Genus: Evacanthus; Lepeletier & Serville, 1828

= Evacanthus =

Genus of true bugs

Evacanthus is a genus of leafhoppers belonging to the family Cicadellidae.

The genus was first described by Amédée Louis Michel le Peletier, comte de Saint-Fargeau and Jean Guillaume Audinet-Serville in 1828.

The species of this genus are found in Eurasia and North America.

== Species ==
The following species are recognised in the genus Evacanthus:

- Evacanthus acuminatus
- Evacanthus albicostatus
- Evacanthus albipennis
- Evacanthus albomaculatus
- Evacanthus albovittatus
- Evacanthus asiaticus
- Evacanthus bellaustralis
- Evacanthus bellus
- Evacanthus biguttatus
- Evacanthus bistigmanus
- Evacanthus bivittatus
- Evacanthus breviceps
- Evacanthus chlamidatus
- Evacanthus convolutus
- Evacanthus danmainus
- Evacanthus densus
- Evacanthus digitatus
- Evacanthus distinctus
- Evacanthus extrema
- Evacanthus fanjinganus
- Evacanthus fatuus
- Evacanthus flavocostatus
- Evacanthus flavonervosus
- Evacanthus fuscous
- Evacanthus grandipes
- Evacanthus hairus
- Evacanthus heimianus
- Evacanthus interruptus
- Evacanthus kuohi
- Evacanthus lacunar
- Evacanthus laminatus
- Evacanthus latus
- Evacanthus longianus
- Evacanthus longispinosus
- Evacanthus longus
- Evacanthus manaliensis
- Evacanthus manpingensis
- Evacanthus militaris
- Evacanthus nigramericanus
- Evacanthus nigrescens
- Evacanthus nigrifasciatus
- Evacanthus nigriscutus
- Evacanthus ochraceus
- Evacanthus ogumae
- Evacanthus papuensis
- Evacanthus procerus
- Evacanthus qiansus
- Evacanthus repexus
- Evacanthus rostagnoi
- Evacanthus rubrivenosus
- Evacanthus rubroniger
- Evacanthus rufescens
- Evacanthus ruficostatus
- Evacanthus rufomarginatus
- Evacanthus spinosus
- Evacanthus stigmatus
- Evacanthus taeniatus
- Evacanthus trimaculatus
- Evacanthus uncinatus
- Evacanthus ustanuchus
- Evacanthus wui
- Evacanthus yeshwanthi
- Evacanthus yinae
