= Phlogis kibalensis =

Scientific classification
- Domain: Eukaryota
- Kingdom: Animalia
- Phylum: Arthropoda
- Class: Insecta
- Order: Hemiptera
- Suborder: Auchenorrhyncha
- Family: Cicadellidae
- Genus: Phlogis
- Species: P. kibalensis

Binomial name
- Phlogis kibalensis (Helden, 2022)

Species of insect

Phlogis kibalensis is a species of insect in the leafhopper family. P. kibalensis was described in 2022 by Alvin Helden, after being discovered in Kibale National Park, in western Uganda, on a student field trip from Anglia Ruskin University.

== Description ==
Phlogis kibalensis is 6.5 millimetres (0.26 in) long and has a metallic sheen with a pitted body surface. The male organs are partly leaf shaped. P. kibalensis feeds on plant sap and is preyed by beetles, birds, parasitic wasp, spiders and other invertebrates.
