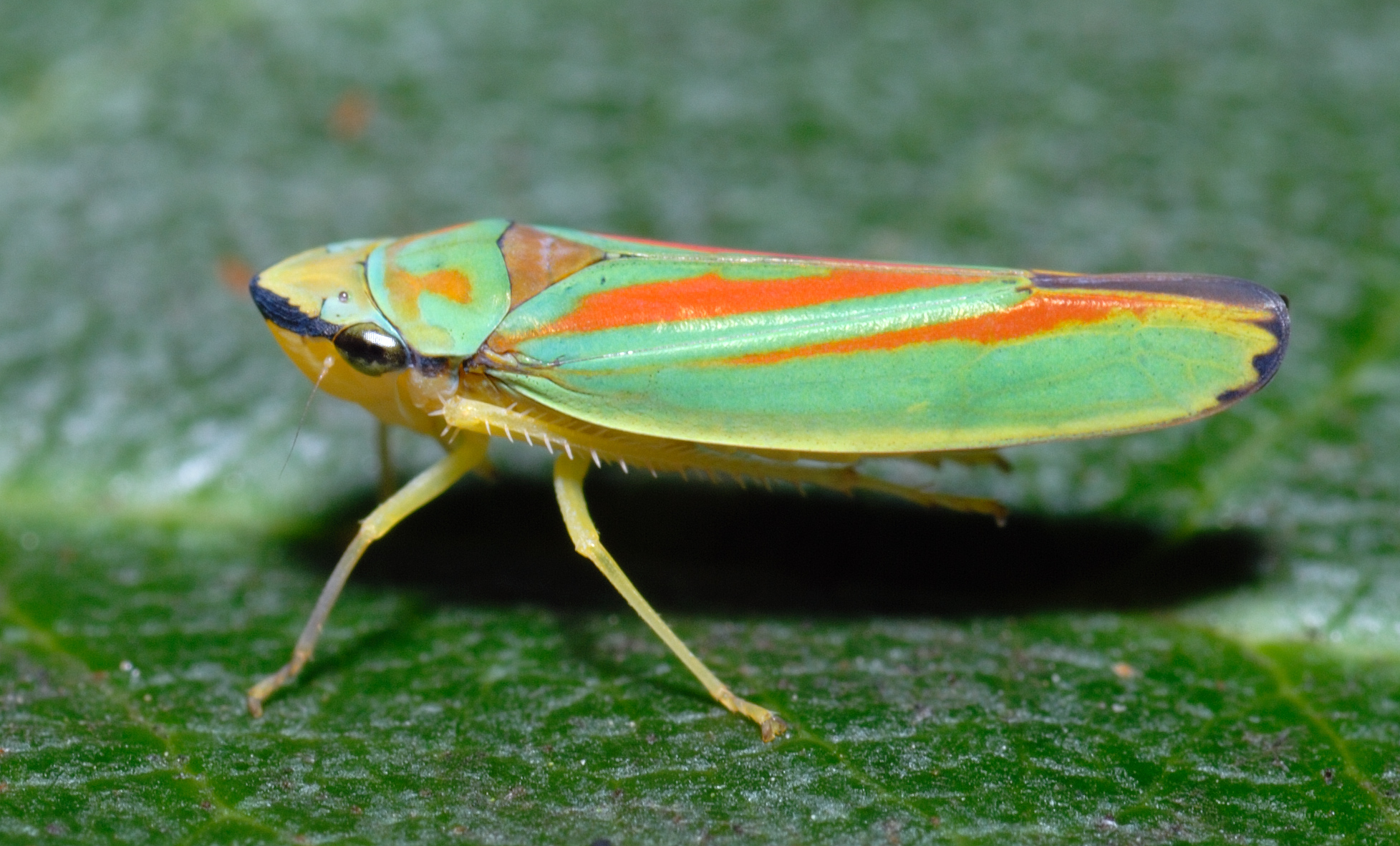

Scientific classification
- Kingdom: Animalia
- Phylum: Arthropoda
- Clade: Pancrustacea
- Class: Insecta
- Order: Hemiptera
- Suborder: Auchenorrhyncha
- Family: Cicadellidae
- Genus: Graphocephala
- Species: G. fennahi

Binomial name
- Graphocephala fennahi Young, 1977

= Graphocephala fennahi =

Rhododendron leafhopper

Species of true bug

Graphocephala fennahi (rhododendron leafhopper) is a species of leafhopper native to the United States. Its common name derives from it feeding on the sap of rhododendrons. The species was introduced to Great Britain in the 1930s and continental Europe in the 1970s. They possibly contribute to the spread of the rhododendron fungus (Pycnostysanus azaleae) through Europe.

== Description ==
Adults possess green wings with purple tips which each feature two orange stripes. Their heads, undersides and legs are yellow, and they have a purple stripe across the top of their heads, extending over the eyes. Males are 7.4-8.8 mm (about 0.35 in) long, and females are a little larger, around 8.2–9 mm (about 0.35 in). Nymphs are light yellow and wingless. They move by jumping or, as adults, flying short distances. When disturbed, they quickly jump away. Skin sheds of the leafhopper can be found on the underside of leaves. They are related to cicadas, spittlebugs, and treehoppers. They feed on the sap from rhododendron plants by sucking it out with a proboscis.

== Habitats ==
They are recorded in grassy lands, brushy habitats, and mixed hardwood forests, usually found in areas with rhododendron. They are also commonly found in gardens and parks where rhododendrons or azaleas grow.

== Communication ==
Leafhoppers use vibrations to communicate. This type of communication is the least understood type of communication. It is also believed that using the vibrations, the leafhoppers attract females during the mating season.

== Distribution ==
It is native to the mountains of southern Virginia, the western Carolinas, and northern Georgia. Recently seen (Aug 2024) in Northern Illinois (Suburban Chicago). This species of leafhoppers is likely to be found throughout the US and south Canada. They are thought to be carried to Europe on rhododendrons plants. There are websites that a currently watching the leafhopper in Europe and include data about when they were recorded, how much, and where.

== Predators ==
Rhododendron leafhoppers are usually vital food for ladybugs, spiders, and some parasitic wasps. They are afraid of Harmonia axyridis, the Harlequin Ladybird.

== Seasonal occurrence ==
The Rhododendron leafhopper appears in late spring and dies in November (timeline includes May, June, July, August, September, October, and November). This means they have one generation per year. Rhododendron leafhoppers lay eggs at the end of their life cycle in November. The eggs hatch in late April, and they begin feeding on the sap of the rhododendrons. The eggs of the rhododendron leafhoppers are deposited on the underside of the leaf. It takes the leafhopper about three weeks to reach adulthood. The eggs are flat, oval-shaped, and are laid in the inner tissue of the leaf.

== Effects ==
The rhododendron leafhoppers are thought to cause bud blast, which is caused by a fungal pathogen, Pycnostysanus azaleae. It is believed to be leafhoppers because they are becoming more common. To see if this is true, a study was conducted in Bremen, Germany. They recorded the number of exuviae, infected buds, location, stock, bud size, shape, colors, hairs, surface, leaf size, hairs, colors, and surface. After the data was collected, no link between the leafhoppers and the bud blast disease was found. However, some still believe that the leafhoppers are damaging the plants. They feed by sucking plant fluids. This leads to the plants not being able to defend themselves from other animals or diseases.

== Control ==
To stop leafhoppers from spreading, different methods can be used. One method is to lure the predators of leafhoppers to them. Attracting lady beetles, spiders, and birds can help reduce the leafhopper population organically. Another method is row covers, placing nets over the plants to protect them. This stops the leafhoppers from reaching your plants but allows sunlight and water to pass through. Sticky traps can also be used. When placed near plants, the bright color of the sticky trap will draw the leafhoppers in and cause them to be stuck. Some non-organic ways are insecticidal soap and insecticides. The soap works best when the leafhoppers are not fully grown. The final way is insecticides like pyrethrins, malathion, bifenthrin, cyfluthrin, disulfoton, and acephate. The two non-organic ways are effective against young leafhoppers due to the limit on their mobility.

Graphocephala fennahi on rhododendron bud

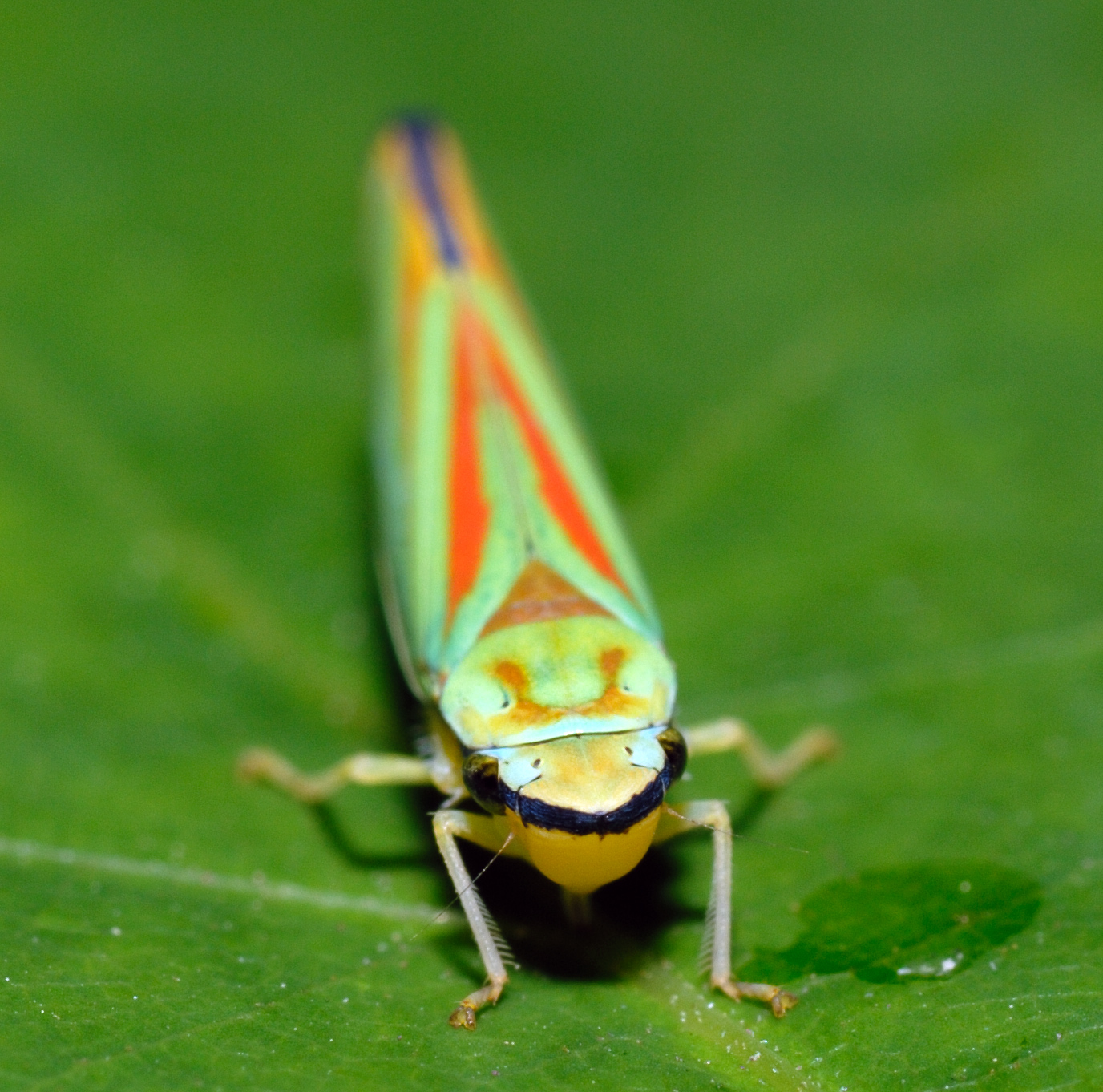
Front view

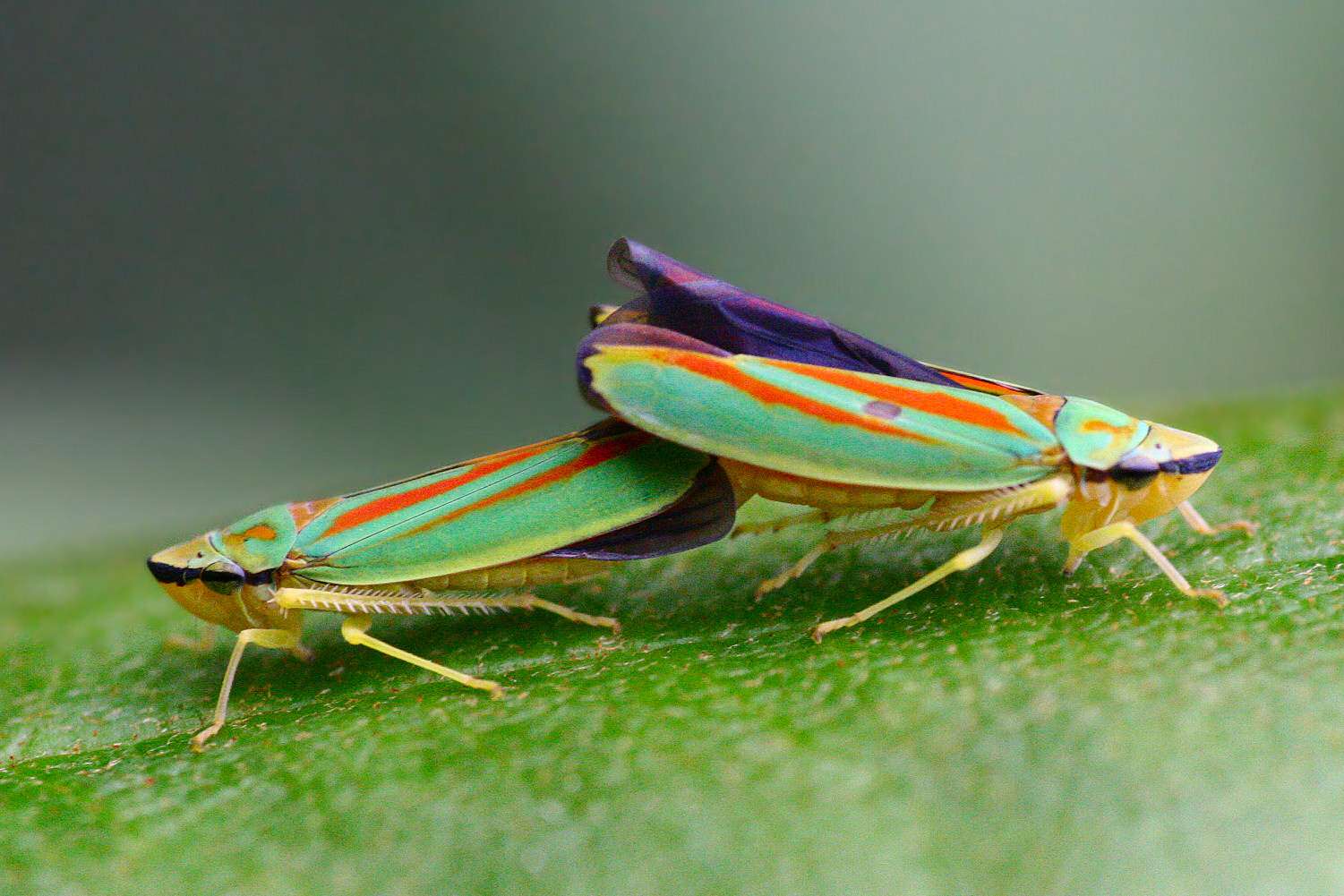
Rhododendron leafhoppers mating
