= Phlogis =

Scientific classification
- Kingdom: Animalia
- Phylum: Arthropoda
- Clade: Pancrustacea
- Class: Insecta
- Order: Hemiptera
- Suborder: Auchenorrhyncha
- Family: Cicadellidae
- Subfamily: Signoretiinae
- Tribe: Phlogisini
- Genus: Phlogis; Linnavuori, 1979

Species
- Phlogis kibalensis Helden, 2022; Phlogis mirabilis Linnavuori, 1979

Genus of leafhoppers

Phlogis is a genus of leafhoppers in the family Cicadellidae.
