= Nirvana (leafhopper) =

Scientific classification
- Domain: Eukaryota
- Kingdom: Animalia
- Phylum: Arthropoda
- Class: Insecta
- Order: Hemiptera
- Suborder: Auchenorrhyncha
- Family: Cicadellidae
- Subfamily: Evacanthinae
- Genus: Nirvana; Kirkaldy, 1900

Species
- Several, including: Nirvana longitudinalis Nirvana pallida Nirvana suturalis

Genus of true bugs

Nirvana is a leafhopper genus belonging to the Evacanthinae subfamily and the tribe Nirvanini. They are distinguishable from other leafhopper subfamilies by their uniquely shaped head and the presence of two preapical cells alone on the tegmen.
