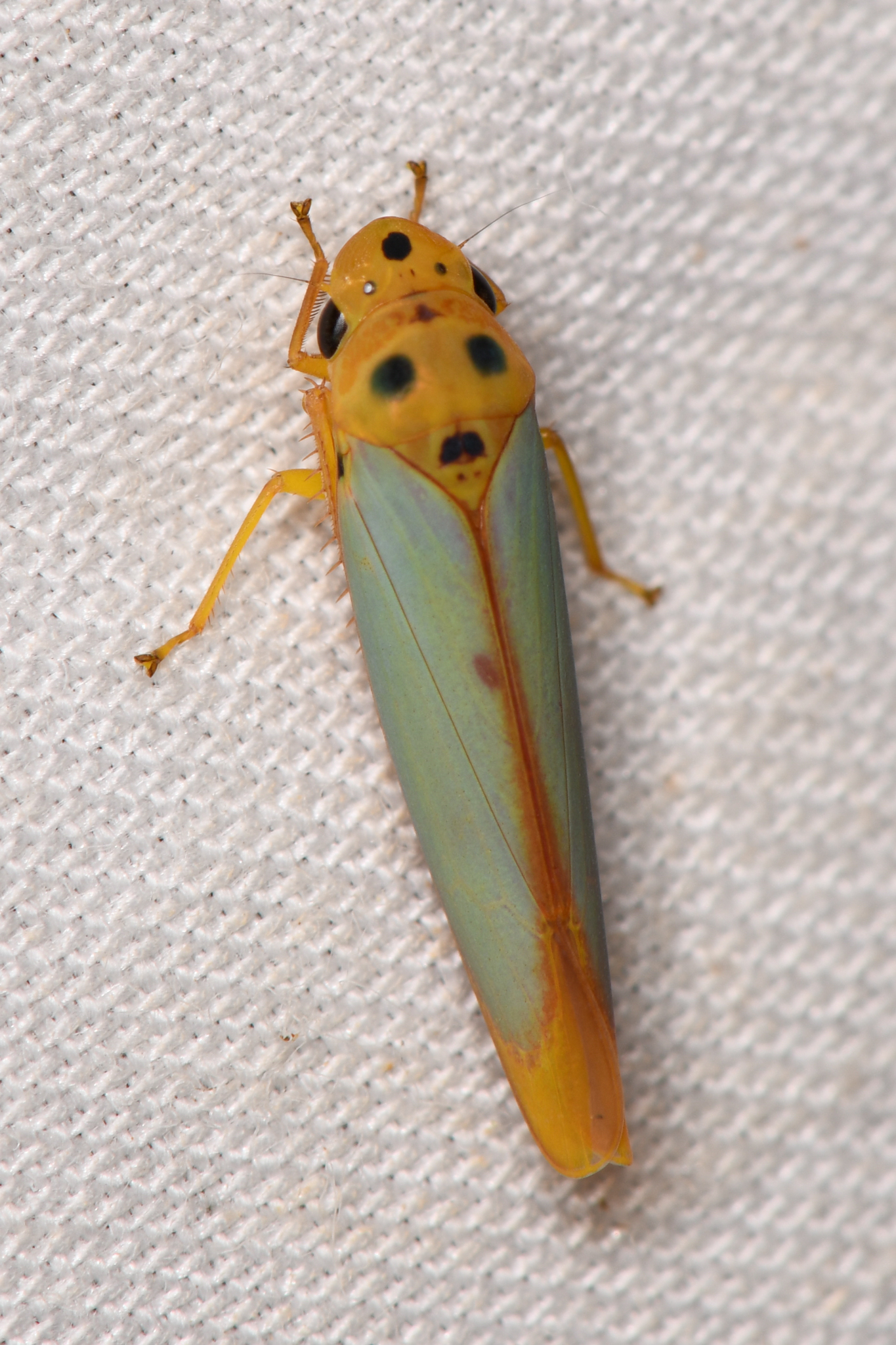

Scientific classification
- Domain: Eukaryota
- Kingdom: Animalia
- Phylum: Arthropoda
- Class: Insecta
- Order: Hemiptera
- Suborder: Auchenorrhyncha
- Family: Cicadellidae
- Genus: Graphocephala
- Species: G. distanti

Binomial name
- Graphocephala distanti Metcalf, 1965

= Graphocephala distanti =

Species of insect

Graphocephala distanti is a leafhopper in the genus Graphocephala native to Panama and Costa Rica.

== Description ==
It is identified by its blue back wings and yellow head with spots on top of the head. The abdomen and head have a small breakoff. The back of the wings are yellow tinged.

This species was first described by Metcalf in 1965.

== Specimens ==
There are many dead/pinned specimens on the internet.

live specimens are mostly taken via iNaturalist observation.
