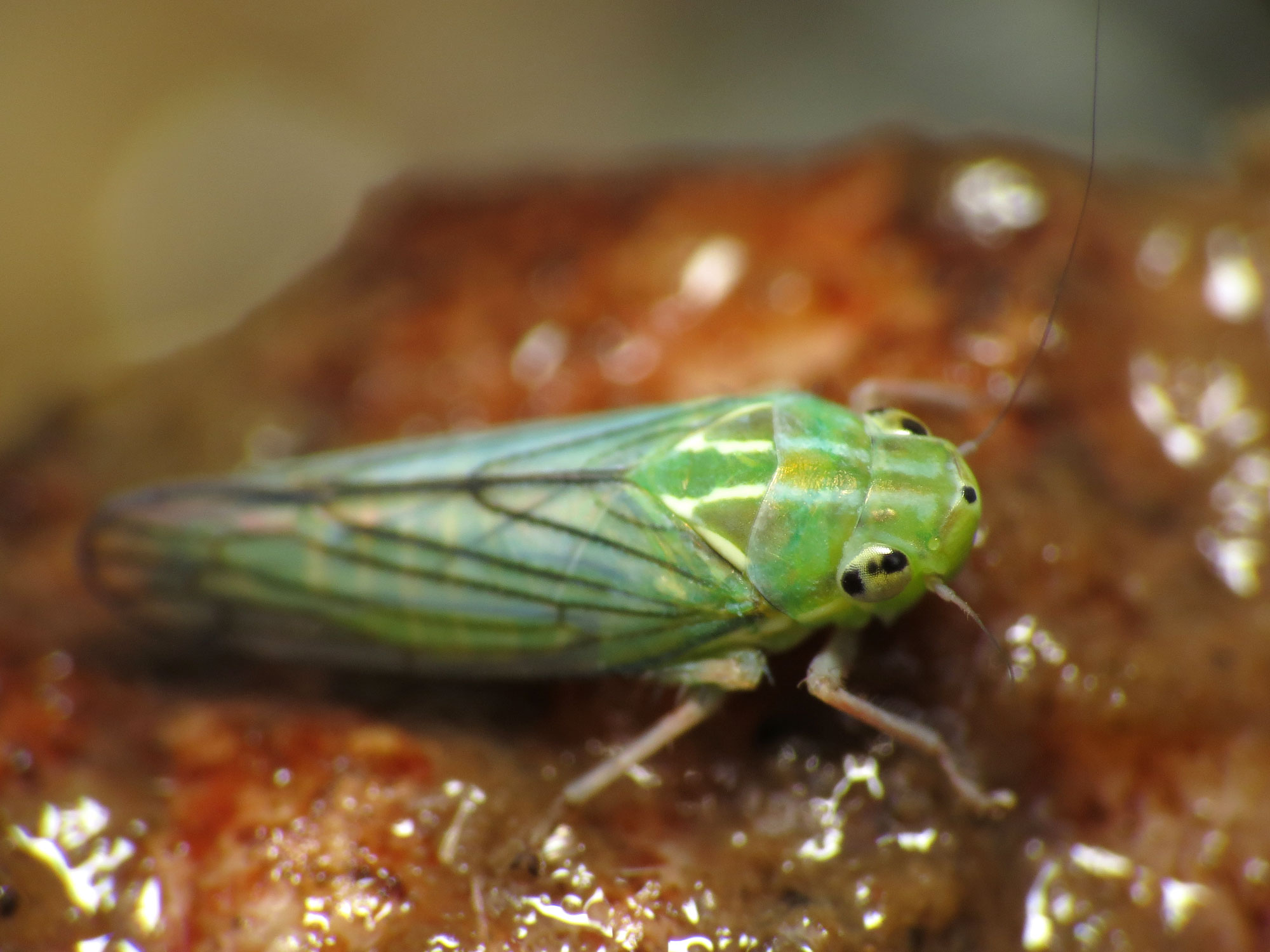
- Neocoelidia sp. Molino Basin, Santa Catalina Mountains, Pima County, Arizona, USA. 18 September 2012

Scientific classification
- Kingdom: Animalia
- Phylum: Arthropoda
- Class: Insecta
- Order: Hemiptera
- Suborder: Auchenorrhyncha
- Family: Cicadellidae
- Subfamily: Neocoelidiinae
- Tribe: Neocoelidiini
- Genus: Neocoelidia; Gillette & Baker, 1895

= Neocoelidia =

Genus of leafhoppers

Neocoelidia is a genus of leafhoppers in the family Cicadellidae. There are about 18 described species in Neocoelidia found in the Americas.

== Species ==
These 18 species belong to the genus Neocoelidia:

- Neocoelidia balli Knull 1942^{c g}
- Neocoelidia bifida DeLong 1953^{c g}
- Neocoelidia candida Ball 1909^{c g}
- Neocoelidia diabola Knull 1942^{c g}
- Neocoelidia fuscodorsata Fowler 1900^{c g}
- Neocoelidia fuscovittata^{b}
- Neocoelidia lactipennis Van Duzee 1890^{c g}
- Neocoelidia onca Kramer 1967^{c g}
- Neocoelidia orientalis DeLong 1953^{c g}
- Neocoelidia orovila Ball 1916^{c g}
- Neocoelidia pulchella Ball 1909^{c g}
- Neocoelidia reticulata Ball 1909^{c g}
- Neocoelidia romantica Knull 1942^{c g}
- Neocoelidia tuberculata Baker, 1898^{c g b}
- Neocoelidia tumidifrons Gillette & Baker, 1895^{c g b}
- Neocoelidia verecunda Fowler 1900^{c g}
- Neocoelidia virgata DeLong 1953^{c g}
- Neocoelidia vittapennis DeLong 1924^{c g}

Data sources: i = ITIS, c = Catalogue of Life, g = GBIF, b = Bugguide.net
