= Tahura =

Scientific classification
- Domain: Eukaryota
- Kingdom: Animalia
- Phylum: Arthropoda
- Class: Insecta
- Order: Hemiptera
- Suborder: Auchenorrhyncha
- Family: Cicadellidae
- Subfamily: Evacanthinae
- Tribe: Nirvanini
- Genus: Tahura; Melichar, 1926

Genus of true bugs

Tahura is a leafhopper genus belonging to the Evacanthinae subfamily and the tribe Nirvanini.

== Species ==
The following species are recognised in the genus Tahura:

- Tahura bifida Dietrich, 2004 – Peru
- Tahura brevis Dietrich, 2004 – Peru
- Tahura divergens Dietrich, 2004 – Peru
- Tahura emarginata Dietrich, 2004 – Peru
- Tahura fowleri Kramer, 1976 – Colombia, Ecuador, Peru
- Tahura latidens Dietrich, 2004 – Peru
- Tahura parallela Dietrich, 2004 – Peru
- Tahura pseudospicata Dietrich, 2004 – Peru
- Tahura recurvata Dietrich, 2004 – Peru
- Tahura spicata Dietrich, 2004 – Peru
- Tahura villaricensis Dietrich, 2004 – Peru
- Tahura yanachagensis Dietrich, 2004 – Peru
