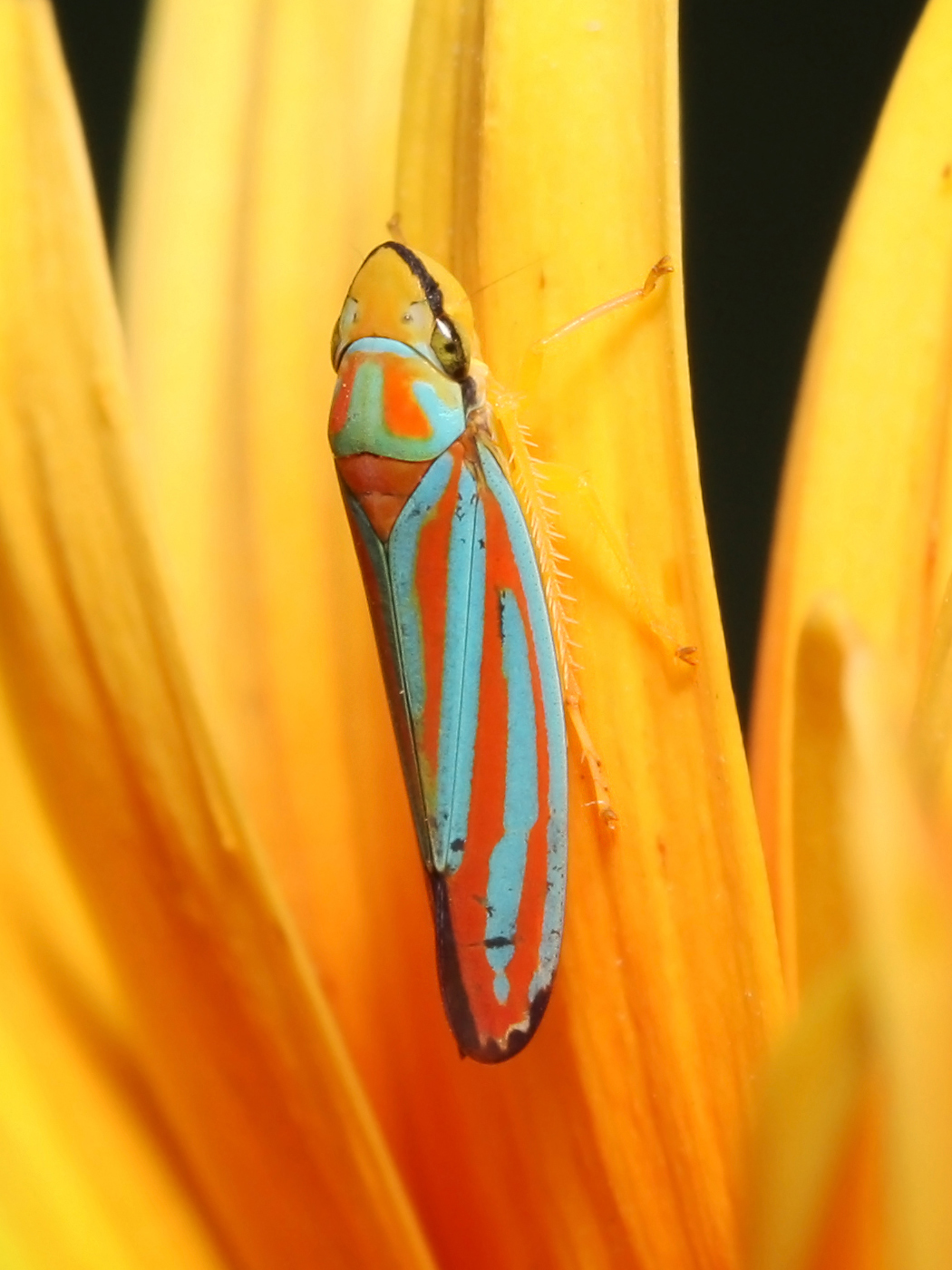
- Graphocephala coccinea

Scientific classification
- Domain: Eukaryota
- Kingdom: Animalia
- Phylum: Arthropoda
- Class: Insecta
- Order: Hemiptera
- Suborder: Auchenorrhyncha
- Family: Cicadellidae
- Tribe: Cicadellini
- Genus: Graphocephala; Van Duzee, 1916

Type species
- Cicada coccinea Forster, 1771

= Graphocephala =

Genus of leafhoppers

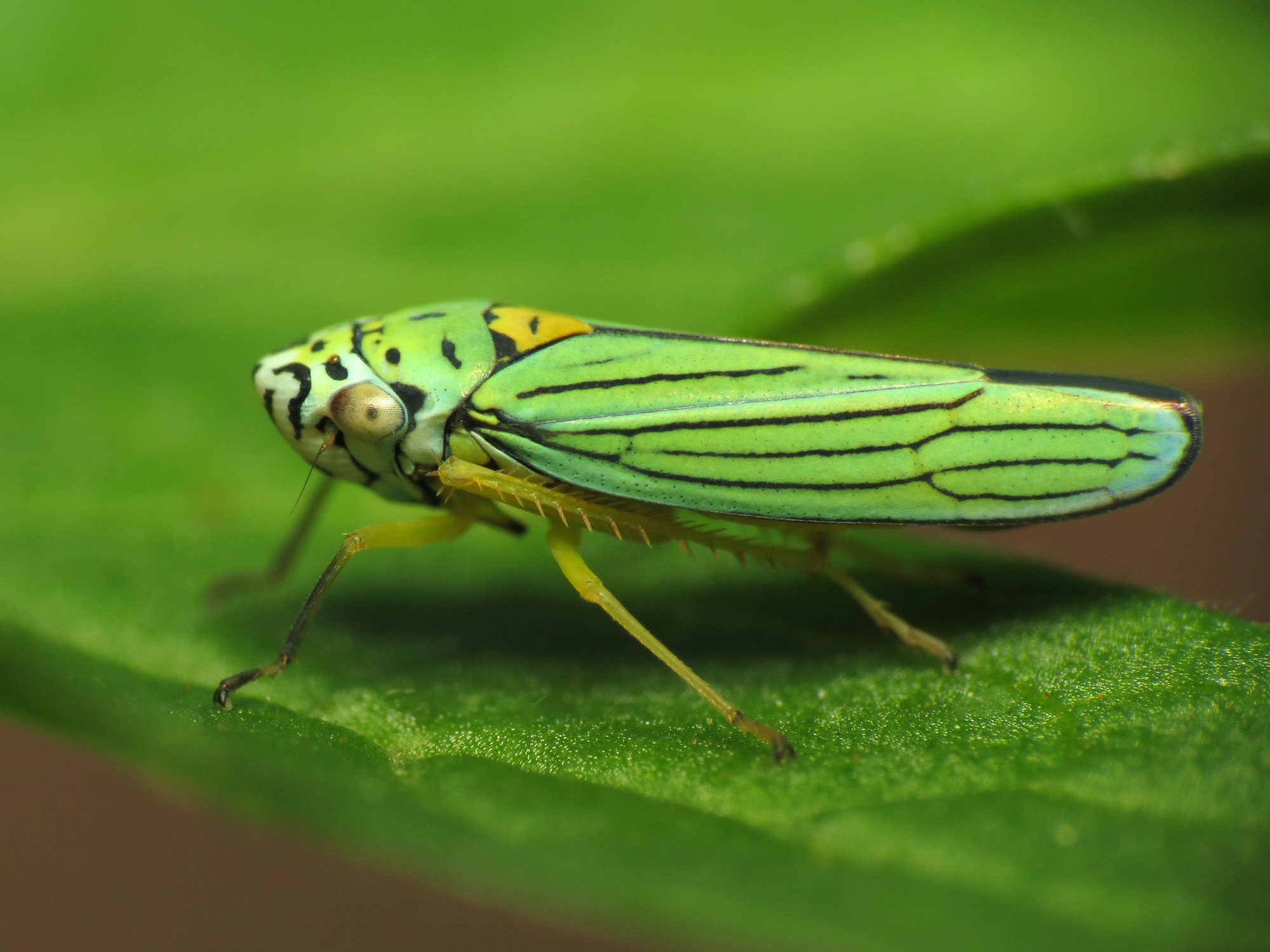
G. atropunctata

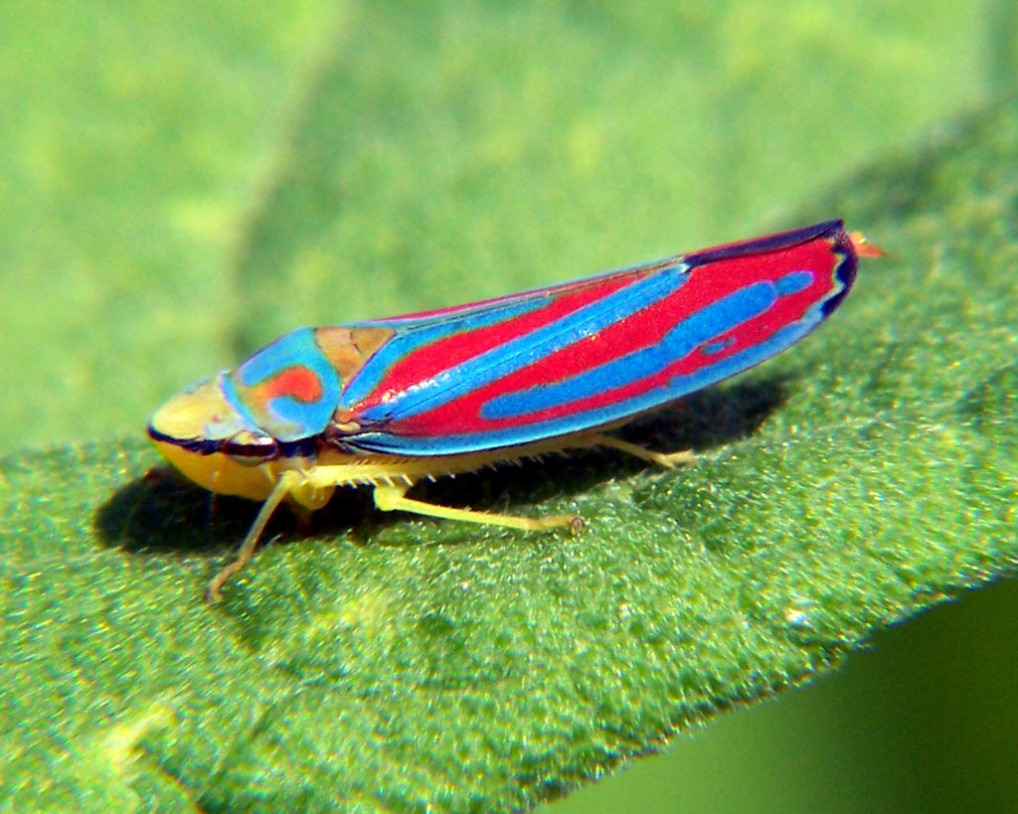
G. coccinea

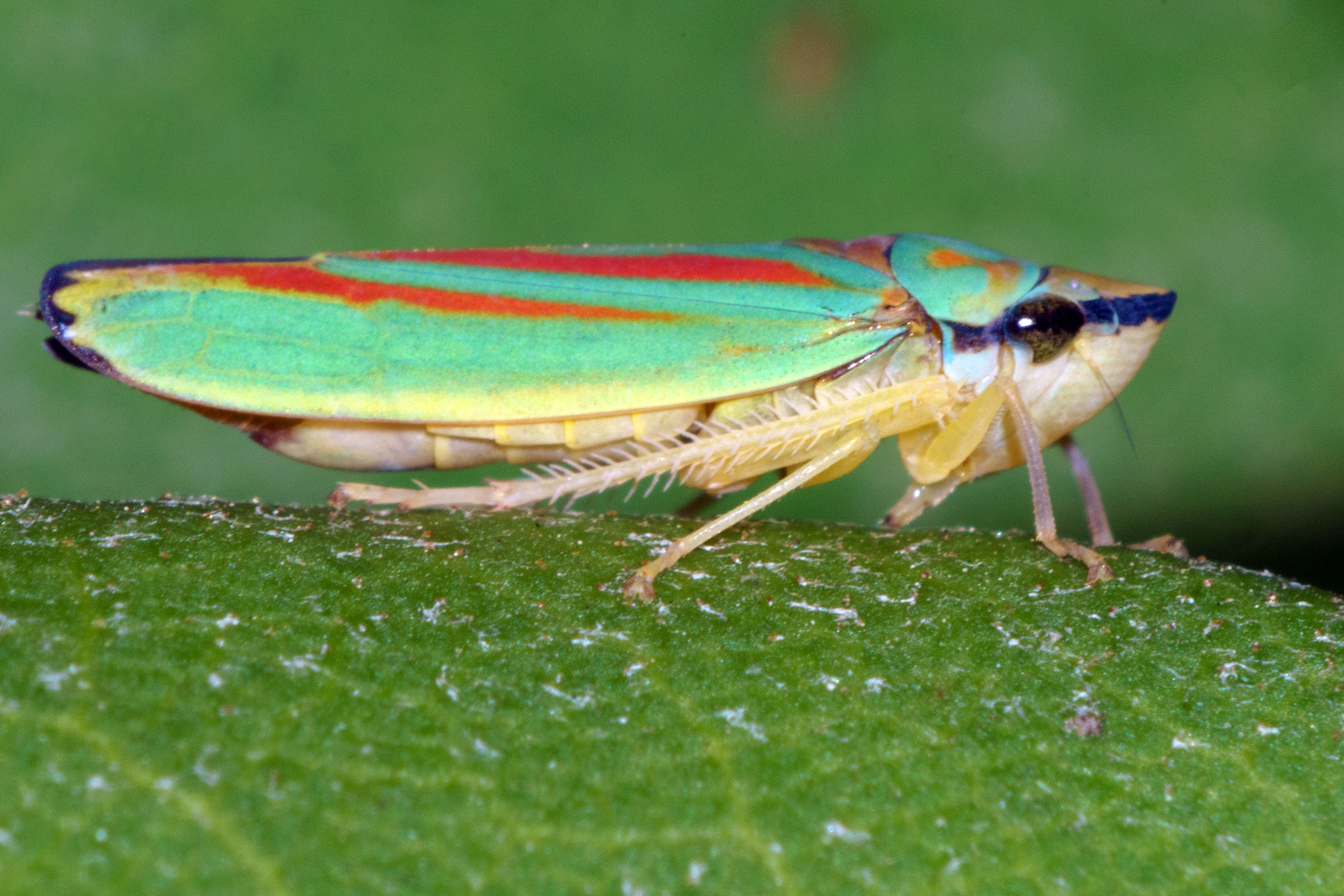
G. fennahi

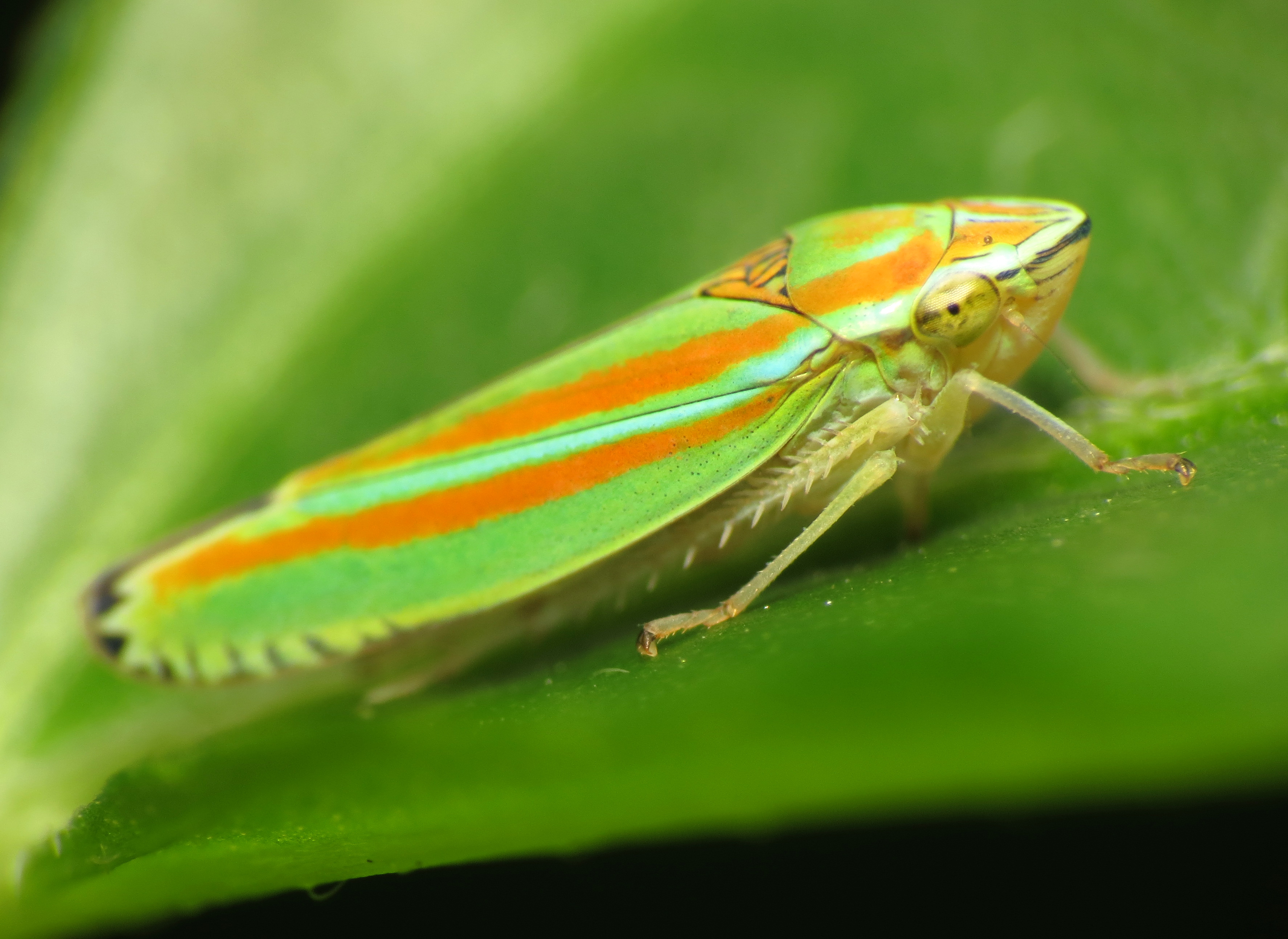
G. versuta

Graphocephala is a large genus of leafhoppers, found from southern Canada to northern South America.

== Species ==
- G. affinula Osborn, 1926
- G. alagarta Young, 1977
- G. albomaculata (Distant, 1879)
- G. apicata Young, 1977
- G. atropunctata
- G. attenuata Osborn, 1926
- G. aurolineata (Fowler, 1900)
- G. bilimeki (Fowler, 1900)
- G. bivittata Nielson & Godoy, 1995
- G. brevisula Osborn, 1926
- G. cardinula Osborn, 1926
- G. clepsydra (Fowler, 1900)
- G. coccinea (Forster, 1771)
- G. complete (Fowler, 1900)
- G. composita (Fowler, 1900)
- G. contractula Osborn, 1926
- G. coronella Nielson & Godoy, 1995
- G. costaricensis (Distant, 1879)
- G. crusa Godoy, 2006
- G. curvatula Osborn, 1926
- G. cythura (Baker, 1898)
- G. delongi Young, 1977
- G. depicta Young, 1997
- G. distanti Metcalf, 1965
- G. dominicana Dozier, 1931
- G. eythura (Baker, 1898)
- G. fennahi Young, 1977
- G. flaccida (Fowler, 1900)
- G. flavovittata Metcalf, 1955
- G. haitiensis Dozier, 1931
- G. hieroglyphica (Say, 1830)
- G. humeralis Osborn, 1926
- G. ignava Ball, 1936
- G. induta (Fowler, 1900)
- G. innervis (Fowler, 1900)
- G. involuta Osborn, 1926
- G. inveola Osborn, 1926
- G. picta (Walker)
- G. kukla Young, 1977
- G. longula Osborn, 1926
- G. luculenta (Fowler, 1900)
- G. ludicula (Osborn, 1926)
- G. penignava Young, 1977
- G. plebejula Osborn, 1926
- G. psephena Young, 1977
- G. pulchra Young, 1977
- G. riverae Godoy, 2006
- G. rufimargo (Walker, 1858)
- G. sasaima Young, 1977
- G. separata Osborn, 1926
- G. sexlineata (Signoret, 1855)
- G. simillima Osborn, 1926
- G. simulata Young, 1977
- G. soluna Young, 1977
- G. sororia (Fowler, 1900)
- G. spinosa Osborn, 1926
- G. submarginalis Osborn, 1926
- G. teliformis (Walker)
- G. trivirgata (Fowler, 1900)
- G. trivittata (Signoret, 1851)
- G. tunicata (Fowler, 1900)
- G. versuta (Say, 1830)
- G. virgaticeps (Fowler, 1900)
- G. ventralis (Fallen, 1806)
