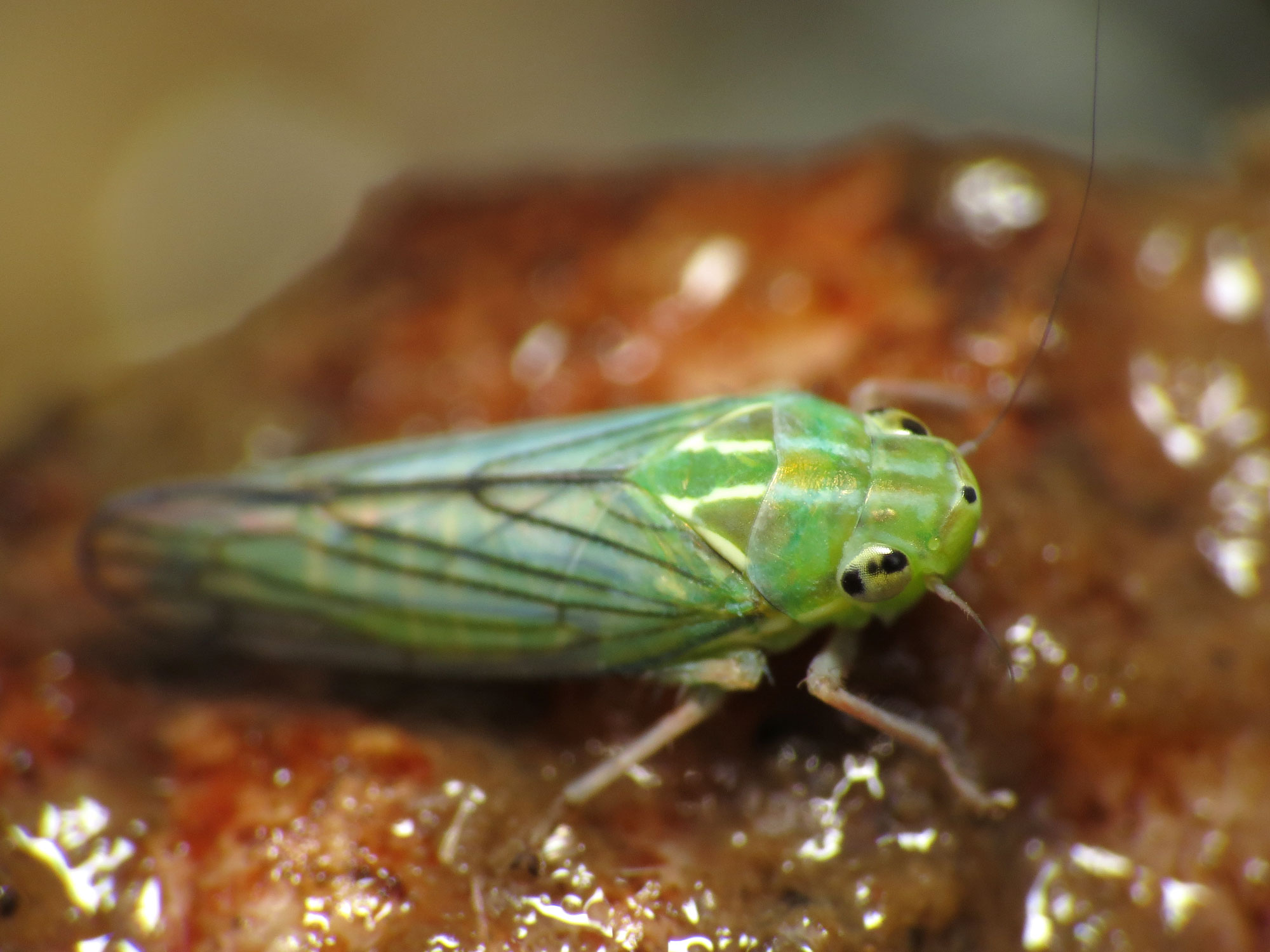
- Coelella distincta in Arizona

Scientific classification
- Domain: Eukaryota
- Kingdom: Animalia
- Phylum: Arthropoda
- Class: Insecta
- Order: Hemiptera
- Suborder: Auchenorrhyncha
- Family: Cicadellidae
- Subfamily: Neocoelidiinae; Oman, 1943

Tribes
- Krocodonini; Neocoelidiini

= Neocoelidiinae =

Subfamily of leafhoppers

Neocoelidiinae is a small subfamily in the family Cicadellidae (leafhoppers). It was originally included within the subfamily Coelidiinae.

== Description ==
Neocoelidiinae are easily recognisable by their very long antennae and distinctive head shape. Many species are incredibly vibrant and are most diverse in the neotropics. There are some species found in the neararctic region, specifically in the genus Neocoelidia.

== Tribes and Genera ==
There are two tribes in the subfamily, one being recently described in 2012. These species are confined to the New World.

Genera considered members of the subfamily Neocoelidiinae are listed below.

=== Krocodonini ===
A South American tribe, created by Marques-Costa & Cavichioli in 2012.

- Krocarites Dietrich & Vega, 1995
- Krocodona Kramer, 1964
- Krocolidia Dietrich, 2003
- Krocozzota Kramer, 1964
- Retrolidia Dietrich, 2003

=== Neocoelidiini ===
The larger tribe of the subfamily.

- Acocoelidia DeLong, 1953
- Aglenita Spinola, 1850
- Biza Walker, F., 1858
- Chinaia Bruner & Metcalf, 1934
- Chinchinota Kramer, 1967
- Cocoelidia DeLong, 1953
- Coelana Kramer, 1964
- Coelella DeLong, 1953
- Coelidiana Oman, 1938
- Coelindroma Kramer, 1967
- Coronalidia Marques-Costa & Cavichioli, 2007
- Deltocoelidia Kramer, 1961
- Megacoelidia Kramer & Linnavuori, 1959
- Nelidina DeLong, 1953
- Neocoelidia Gillette & Baker, 1895
- Neocoelidiana DeLong, 1953
- Neocoelindroma Marques-Costa & Cavichioli, 2007
- Paracoelidiana Marques-Costa & Cavichioli, 2007
- Paraphysiana Bortolli-Chiamolera, Cavichioli & Anderle, 2003
- Placoscopana Gonçalves, Marques-Costa & Ale-Rocha, 2012
- Salvina Melichar, 1926
- Scopocoelidia Marques-Costa & Cavichioli, 2007
- Tetralidia Marques-Costa & Cavichioli, 2008
- Tichocoelidia Kramer, 1962
- Tozzita Kramer, 1964
- Xenocoelidia Kramer, 1959
- Xenocoelidiana Marques-Costa & Cavichioli, 2006
- Xiqilliba Kramer, 1964
