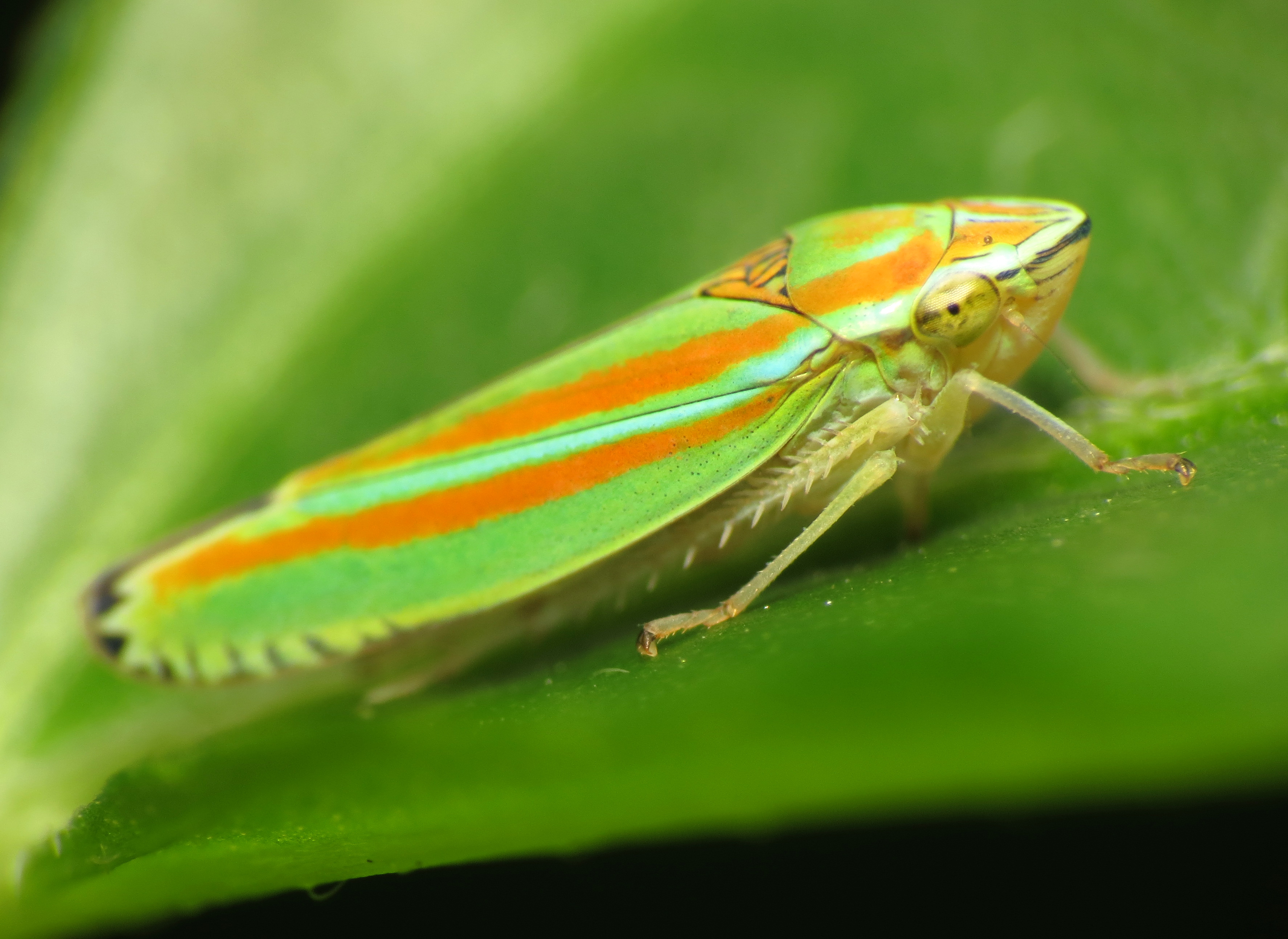

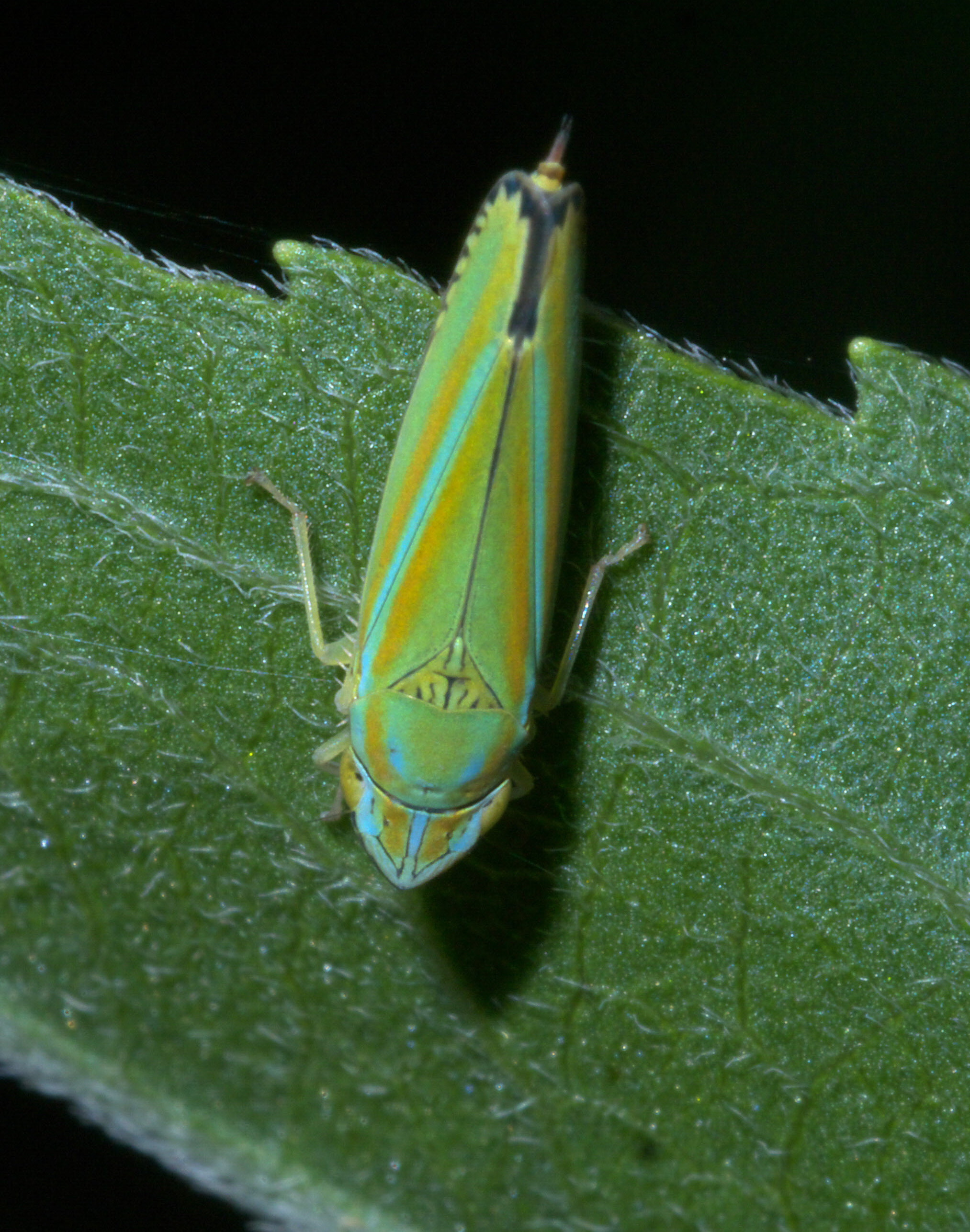

Scientific classification
- Domain: Eukaryota
- Kingdom: Animalia
- Phylum: Arthropoda
- Class: Insecta
- Order: Hemiptera
- Suborder: Auchenorrhyncha
- Family: Cicadellidae
- Genus: Graphocephala
- Species: G. versuta

Binomial name
- Graphocephala versuta Say, 1830

= Graphocephala versuta =

Species of true bug

Graphocephala versuta is a species of sharpshooter in the family Cicadellidae.

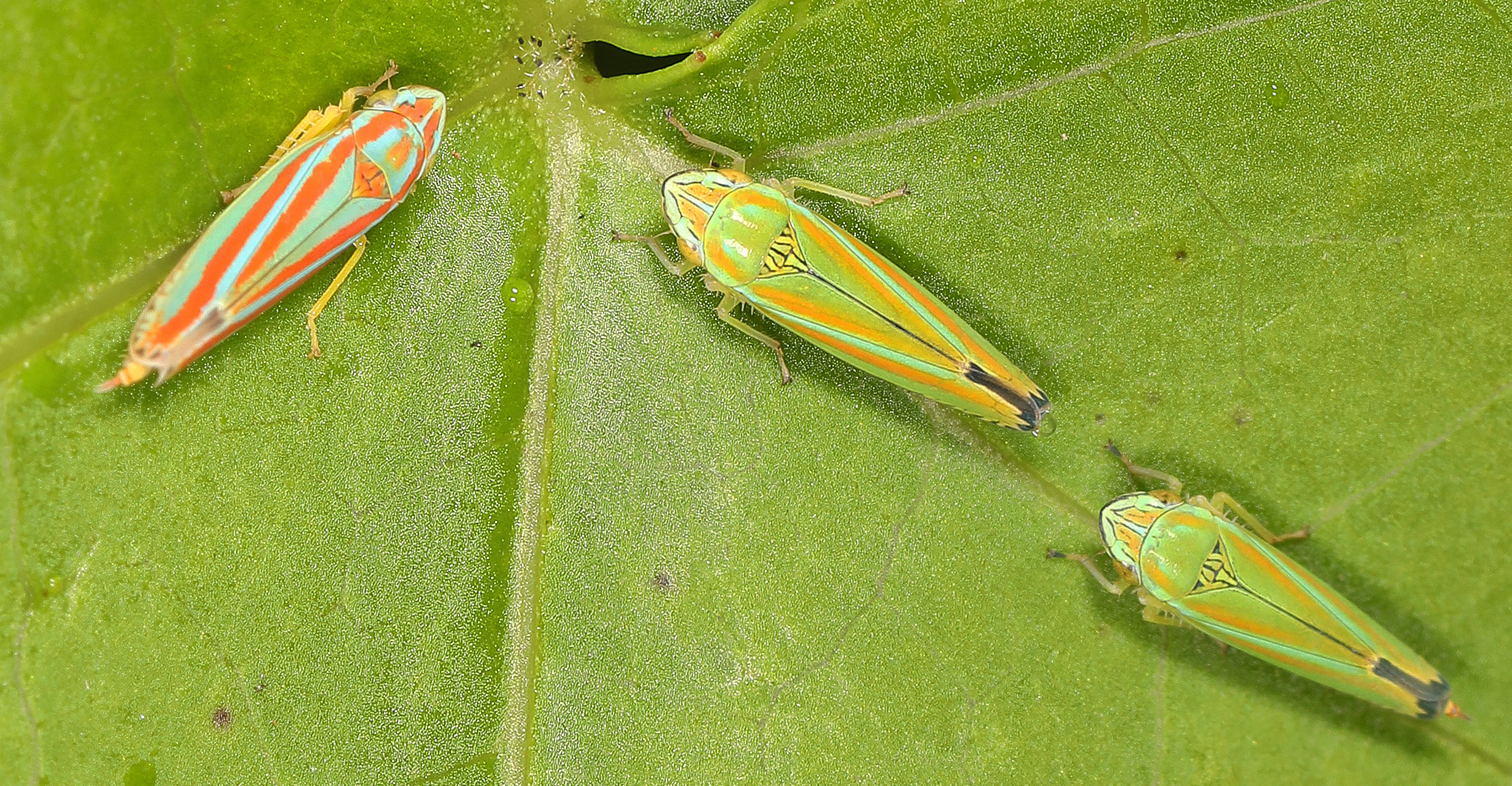
Red and green morphs of G. versuta
