= Signoretiinae =

Scientific classification
- Kingdom: Animalia
- Phylum: Arthropoda
- Clade: Pancrustacea
- Class: Insecta
- Order: Hemiptera
- Suborder: Auchenorrhyncha
- Family: Cicadellidae
- Subfamily: Signoretiinae; C.F.Baker, 1915

Type genus
- Signoretia Stål, 1859

Tribes
- Tribe Phlogisini; Aloka; Chouious; Phlogis; Tribe Signoretiini; Preta; Signoretia

Subfamily of leafhoppers

Signoretiinae, known vernacularly as signoretiines, is a small, unusual, and relatively understudied subfamily of leafhoppers in the family Cicadellidae. The subfamily has sometimes been considered synonymous with the tribe Signoretiini and placed in the subfamily Cicadellinae.

== Description ==
Members of the Signoretiinae are typically distinguished from other cicadellids by their enlarged frontes (front of their heads) and lengthened pronota (front parts of their thoraxes) which cover part of their heads.

== Taxonomy ==
The subfamily Signoretiinae is divided into two tribes, and further subdivided into five genera: the tribe Phlogisini containing the genera Aloka, Chouious, and Phlogis; and the tribe Signoretiini with the genera Preta and Signoretia.

=== History ===
The type genus of the subfamily, Signoretia, was first described by Swedish entomologist Carl Stål in 1859. The subfamily was described by American entomologist Charles Fuller Baker in 1915.

== Distribution ==
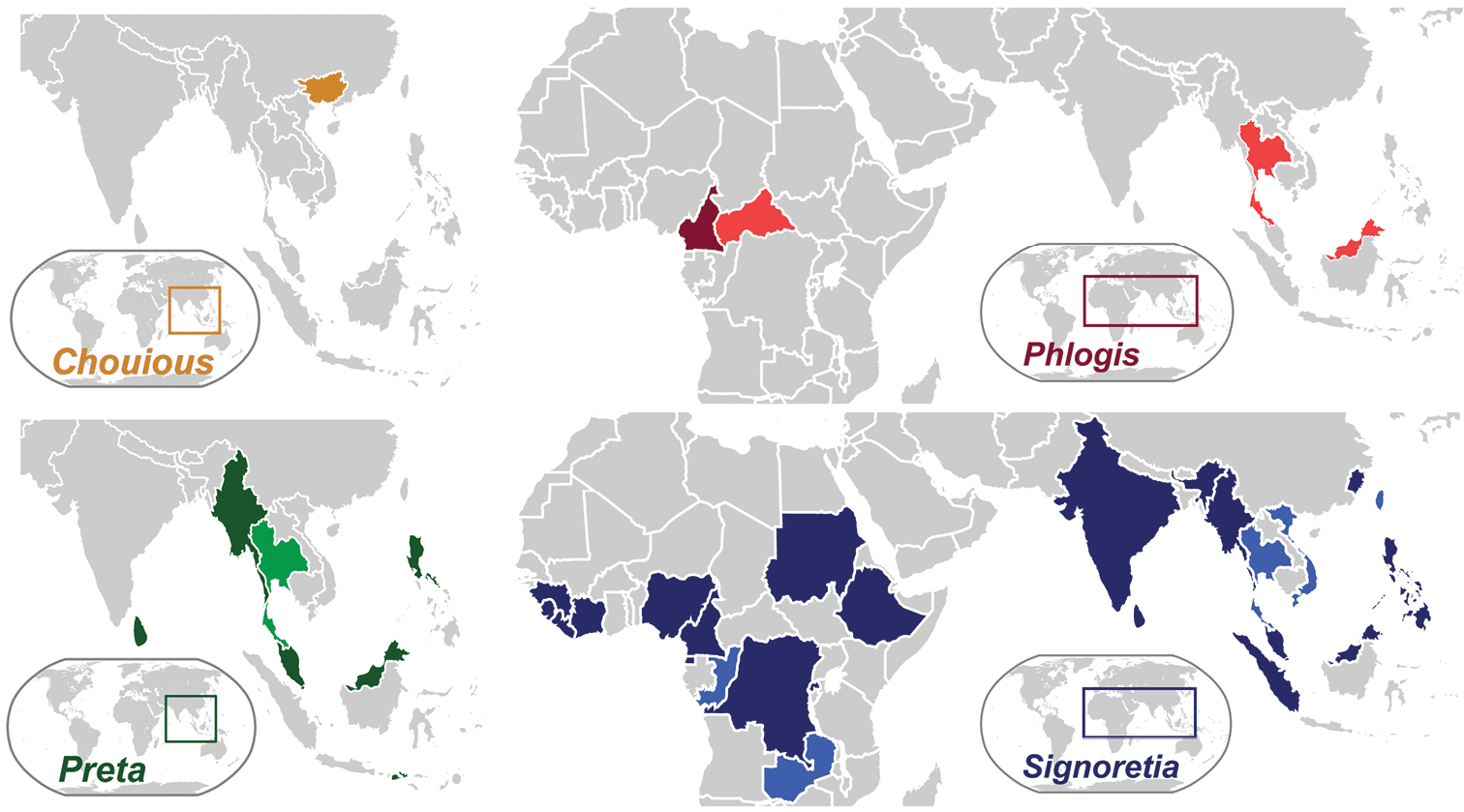
Distribution of the genera Chouious, Phlogis, Preta, and Signoretia according to Takiya et al., 2013.

Members of the Signoretiinae are known to occur in forests in both tropical Africa and Asia, with two species found in Indonesia. Phlogis species are found in the Central African Republic, Malaysia, Thailand, and Uganda; Preta species also in Thailand; and Signoretia species in the Republic of the Congo, Zambia, Thailand, Vietnam, Taiwan, Cameroon, and the Philippines.
