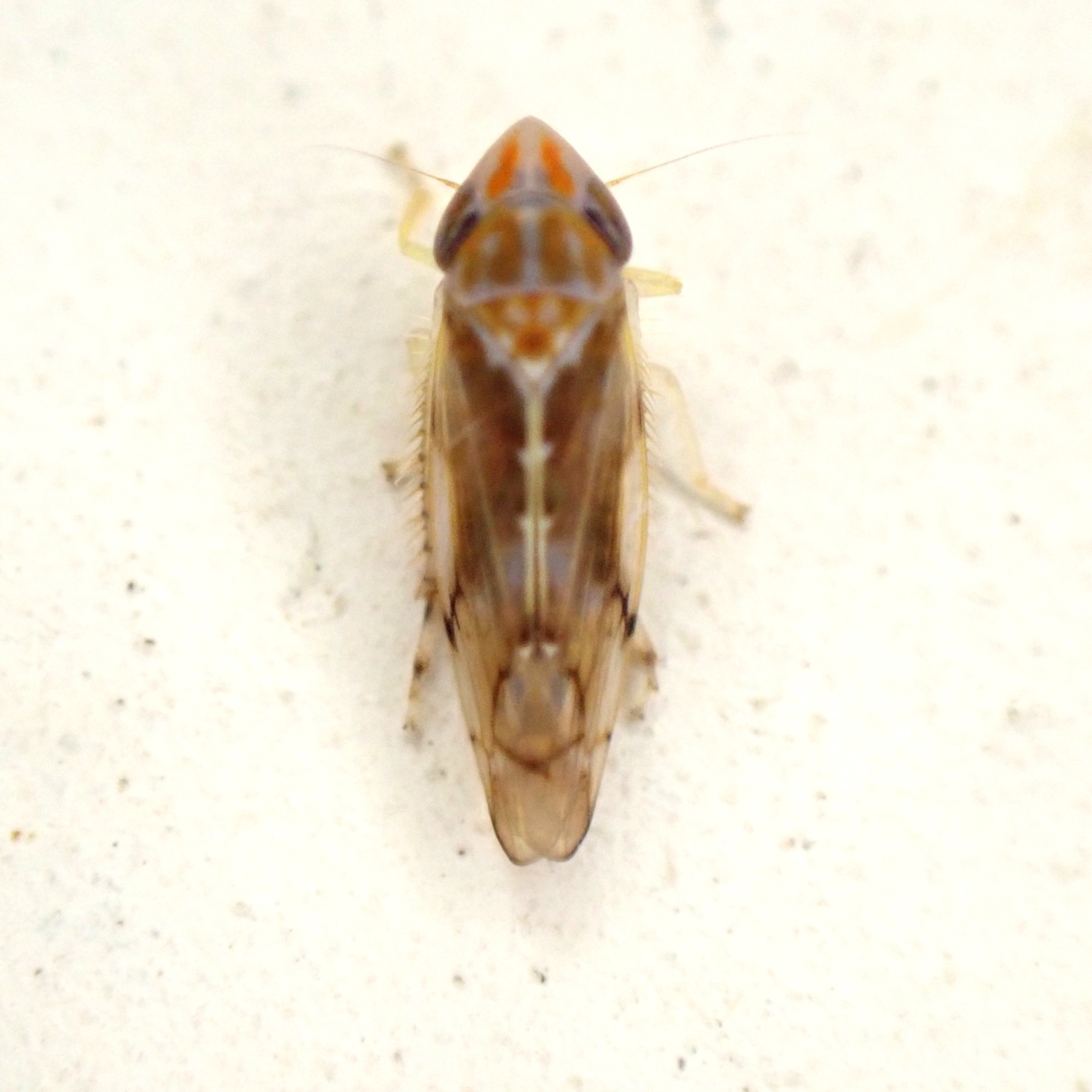
- Benala sp.

Scientific classification
- Kingdom: Animalia
- Phylum: Arthropoda
- Class: Insecta
- Order: Hemiptera
- Suborder: Auchenorrhyncha
- Family: Cicadellidae
- Subfamily: Neobalinae; Linnavuori, 1959

= Neobalinae =

Subfamily of leafhoppers

Neobalinae is a subfamily in the family Cicadellidae (leafhoppers) containing two tribes: the Equeefini from Africa and the Neobalini from the Neotropical realm.

== Description ==
Neobaline leafhoppers are often darkly coloured with fluorescent accents. Members of the subfamily have been found feeding on Dicotyledon trees and shrubs.

== Tribes and genera ==
The following genera in this subfamily are placed in two tribes:

Equeefini Theron, 1986

1. Aletta (bug) Metcalf, 1952
2. Croconelus Theron, 1986
3. Equeefa Distant, 1910
4. Keia Theron, 1984
5. Lesinda McKamey, 2006
6. Mamates Theron, 1986
7. Mgenia Theron, 1984
8. Mlanje Theron, 1986
9. Modderena Theron, 1984
10. Nelrivia Theron, 1986

Neobalini Linnavuori, 1959

1. Benala Oman, 1938
2. Calliscarta Stål, 1869
3. Chibala Linnavuori & DeLong, 1977
4. Conala Oman, 1938
5. Estrianna Zanol, 2012
6. Exolidia Osborn, 1923
7. Neobala Oman, 1938
8. Perubala Linnavuori, 1959
9. Psibala Kramer, 1963
10. Rhobala Kramer, 1963
