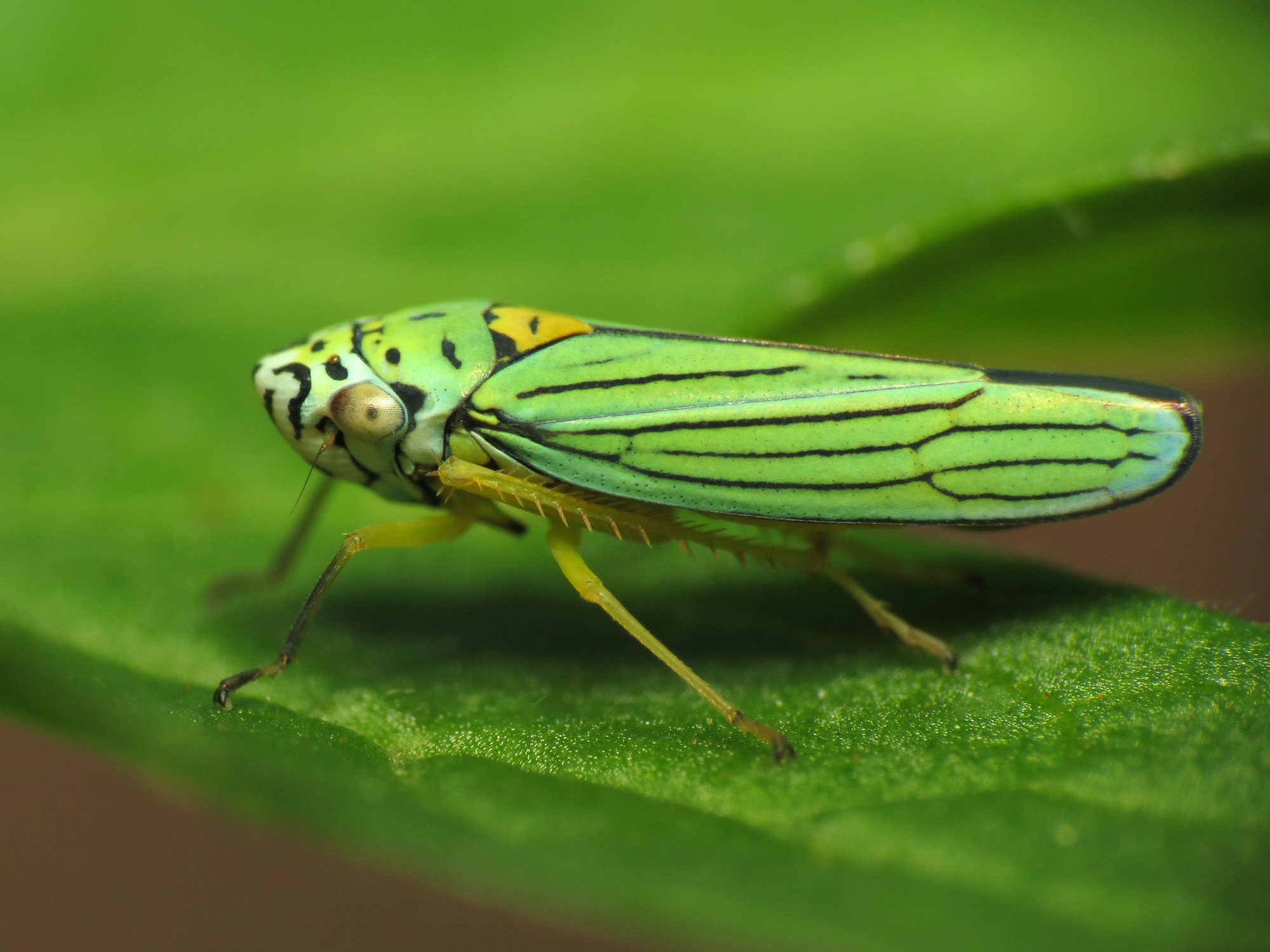

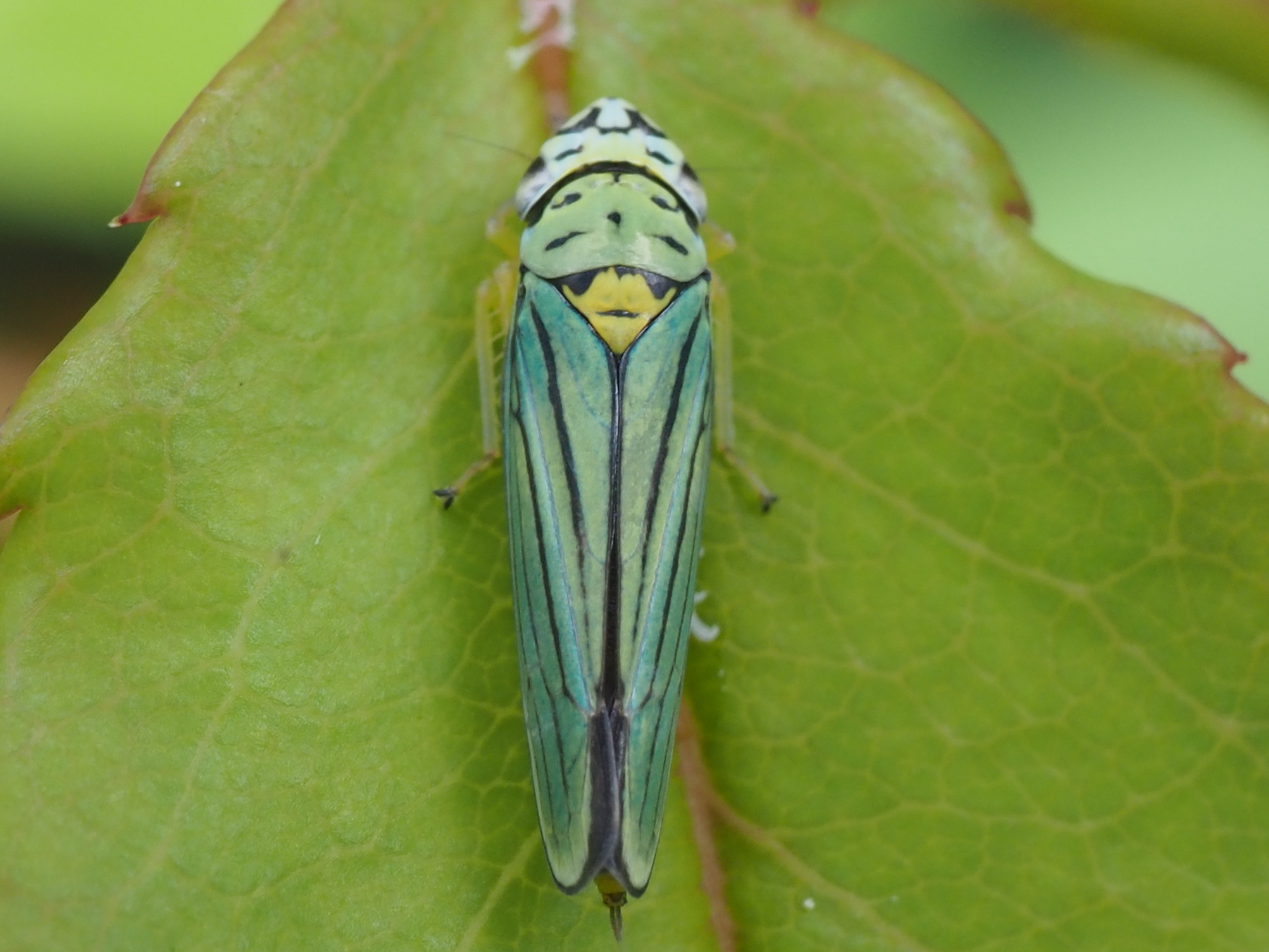

Scientific classification
- Kingdom: Animalia
- Phylum: Arthropoda
- Class: Insecta
- Order: Hemiptera
- Suborder: Auchenorrhyncha
- Family: Cicadellidae
- Genus: Graphocephala
- Species: G. atropunctata

Binomial name
- Graphocephala atropunctata (Signoret, 1854)

Synonyms
- Hordnia atropunctata

= Graphocephala atropunctata =

Species of true bug

Graphocephala atropunctata, commonly known as the blue-green sharpshooter, is a hemipteran bug native to the United States west coast, as well as Arizona and New Mexico. It carries the phytopathogenic bacteria Xylella fastidiosa which infects the xylem of grape vines causing die-back – known as Pierce's disease. This leads to loss of productivity and economic damage to the California vineyards.
