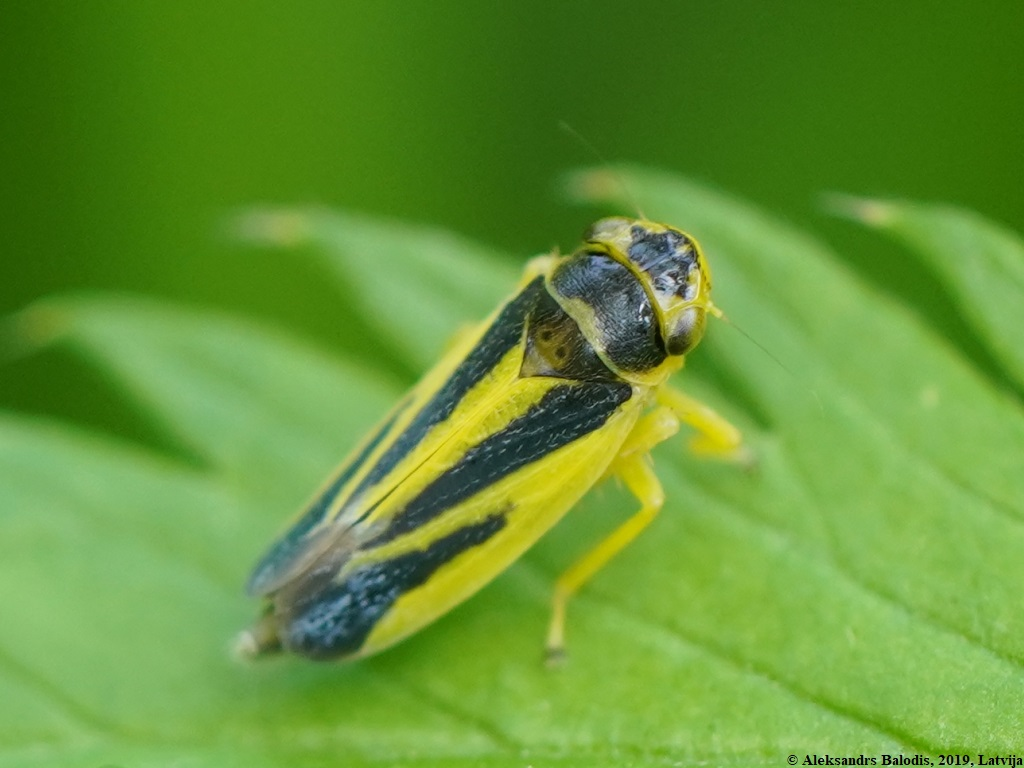
- Evacanthus interruptus

Scientific classification
- Kingdom: Animalia
- Phylum: Arthropoda
- Class: Insecta
- Order: Hemiptera
- Suborder: Auchenorrhyncha
- Family: Cicadellidae
- Subfamily: Evacanthinae; Metcalf, 1939

Tribes
- Balbillini; Evacanthini; Nirvanini; Pagaroniini; Pentoffiini

= Evacanthinae =

Subfamily of leafhoppers

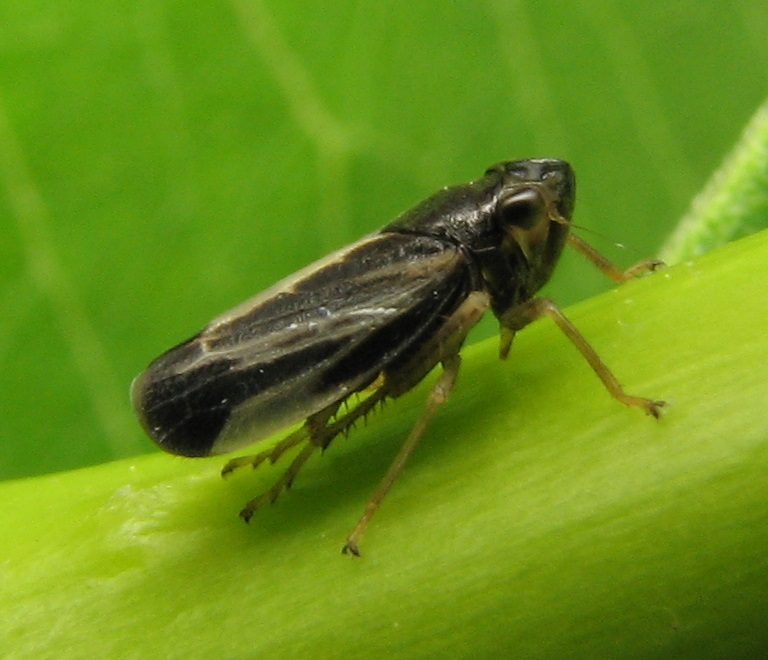
Evacanthus nigramericanus

Evacanthinae is a subfamily in the family Cicadellidae (leafhoppers).

== Distribution ==
Members of Evacanthinae are found worldwide and are on every continent except for Antarctica.

== Tribes and genera ==
There are five tribes in the subfamily, some of which were subfamilies of their own.

=== Balbillini ===
Erected by Baker in 1923. They are found in the Afrotropical and Indomalayan realms. Their colour is mostly dull, being yellowish to greyish in appearance.

- Balbillus Distant, 1908
- Stenotortor Baker, 1923

=== Evacanthini ===
Erected by Metcalf in 1939. They are distributed across most of the Northern Hemisphere and into the Indomalayan realm.

- Apphia Distant, 1918
- Boundarus Li & Wang, 1998
- Bundera Distant, 1908
- Carinata Li & Wang, 1992
- Concavocorona Wang & Zhang, 2014
- Convexana Li, 1994
- Cunedda Distant, 1918
- Diramus Wang & Zhang, 2013
- Evacanthus Le Peletier & Serville, 1825
- Mainda Distant, 1908
- Mediporus Wang & Zhang, 2015
- Multiformis Li & Li, 2012
- Onukia Matsumura, 1912
- Onukiades Ishihara, 1963
- Onukindia Viraktamath & Webb, 2018
- Paraonukia Ishihara, 1963
- Parapythamus Li & Li, 2011
- Processus Huang, 1992
- Pythamus Melichar, 1903
- Pythochandra Wei & Webb, 2014
- Risefronta Li & Wang, 2001
- Riseveinus Li, 1995
- Shortcrowna Li & Li, 2014
- Simaonukia Li & Li, 2017
- Striatanus Li & Wang, 1995
- Subulatus Yang & Zhang, 2001
- Taperus Li & Wang, 1994
- Tengirhinus Ishihara, 1953
- Transvenosus Wang & Zhang, 2015
- Vangama Distant, 1908

=== Nirvanini ===
Erected by Baker in 1923. They are distributed mostly throughout the Southern Hemisphere, but species have spread globally. This tribe previously made up the subfamily Nirvaninae.

- Aequoreus Huang, 1989
- Afrokana Heller, 1972
- Afronirvana Evans, 1955
- Antillonirvana Dietrich, 2004
- Australnirvana Wang, Dietrich & Zhang, 2016
- Buloria Distant, 1908
- Carchariacephalus Montrouzier, 1861
- Chibchanirvana Dietrich, 2004
- Chudania Distant, 1908
- Concaveplana Chen & Li, 1998
- Convexfronta Li, 1997
- Crispina Distant, 1918
- Decursusnirvana Gao, Dai & Zhang, 2014
- Euronirvanella Evans, 1966
- Extensus Huang, 1989
- Jassonirvana Baker, 1923
- Jassosqualus Kramer, 1964
- Kana) Distant, 1908
- Kasunga Linnavuori, 1979
- Kosasia Distant, 1910
- Narecho Jacobi, 1910
- Neonirvana Oman, 1936
- Nirvana Kirkaldy, 1900
- Nirvanoides Baker, 1923
- Oniella Matsumura, 1912
- Ophiuchus Ophiuchus
- Pactana Linnavuori, 1960
- Pythonirvana Baker, 1923
- Sinonirvana Gao, Dai & Zhang, 2014
- Sophonia Walker, F., 1870
- Synogonia Melichar, 1926
- Tahura Melichar, 1926
- Tortor Kirkaldy, 1907

=== Pagaroniini ===
Erected by Anufriev in 1978.

- Friscanina Anufriev, 1978
- Pagaronina Anufriev, 1978
- Epiacanthus Matsumura, 1902
- Friscanus Oman, 1938
- Kurotsuyanus Ishihara, 1953
- Pagaronia Ball, 1902

=== Pentoffiini ===
Erected by Wang, Dietrich & Zhang, 2017.

- Draconirvana Dietrich, 2011
- Pentoffia Kramer, 1964

=== Incertae sedis ===
Genera without placement.

- Evanirvana Hill, 1973
