= Pecan bacterial leaf scorch =

Bacterial disease of pecan trees

Pecan bacterial leaf scorch is a disease of the pecan tree that is common throughout the production regions of the United States caused by the pathogenic bacterium Xylella fastidiosa subsp. multiplex. The pathogen was initially discovered to be coincidentally associated with symptoms of pecan fungal leaf scorch in 1998 and has subsequently been found to be endemic in the southeastern United States, as well as Arizona, California, and New Mexico.

== Host and symptoms ==
Research has so far been identified in 30 cultivars of pecan that are susceptible to pecan bacterial leaf scorch. Some varieties appear to be more highly susceptible to infection than others and no resistant varieties have yet been identified.

Symptoms of pecan bacterial leaf scorch become apparent in late spring, with browning and necrosis of terminal leaflets. These symptoms can be confined to the leaves on one side of a shoot and may be present on all or some of the leaflets. As summer progresses, symptomatic leaflets eventually abscise, leaving behind the rachis, which too eventually falls from the plant. Symptoms can be confined to single or multiple branches, but over multiple years will spread throughout the plant. While the symptoms do not kill the trees, the weakened health leads to reduced yields over time. There are other causes of similar symptoms, such as pecan scorch mites and drought stress, thus a laboratory analysis is recommended when diagnosing the disease.

== Disease cycle ==
Owing to the common cultivation practice of grafting, Xylella fastidiosa often spreads into new orchards through the grafting of infected scion material on clean rootstocks or through infected rootstocks. Additionally, the disease is known to be vectored by certain insects. Thus far, three leafhoppers and two spittlebugs have been shown capable of transmitting the bacteria to pecan, with glassy-winged sharpshooters and adult pecan spittlebugs believed to be the primary vectors responsible for its spread.

== Management ==
The primary management strategy for disease mitigation is to ensure that new orchards are planted with non-infected plants, in order to reduce the initial inoculum that can be spread by insect vectors. This can be facilitated by closely examining nursery trees the summer before transplanting, to confirm that they are asymptomatic for the disease. Additionally, a hot water treatment of the scion material just prior to grafting, has been demonstrated to eliminate the pathogen with a 97% success rate. Given the delayed nature of symptom development, this practice is recommended to reduce the odds of inadvertent graft transmission of the bacteria.

In the event of symptom development in an orchard, infected trees can have limbs and branches pruned to eliminate the disease. It is recommended that this practice be carried out as soon as possible, cutting several feet behind the symptomatic areas. This technique is only recommended for the initial infections in an orchard, on trees displaying terminal symptoms (i.e. far from the trunk), and is not guaranteed to eliminate the pathogen. A better method is to remove the tree entirely from the orchard.

Another management technique is to reduce the number of insect vector carrying the disease. Known insect vectors can be monitored through yellow sticky cards or traps, and when populations are sufficiently high, insecticide sprays can be commenced to reduce the chance of disease spread. Additionally, pecan orchards can be deliberately planted away from habitat favored by the glassy-winged sharpshooter, e.g. citrus, peach, and grape orchards, to reduce populations of the disease vectors.
