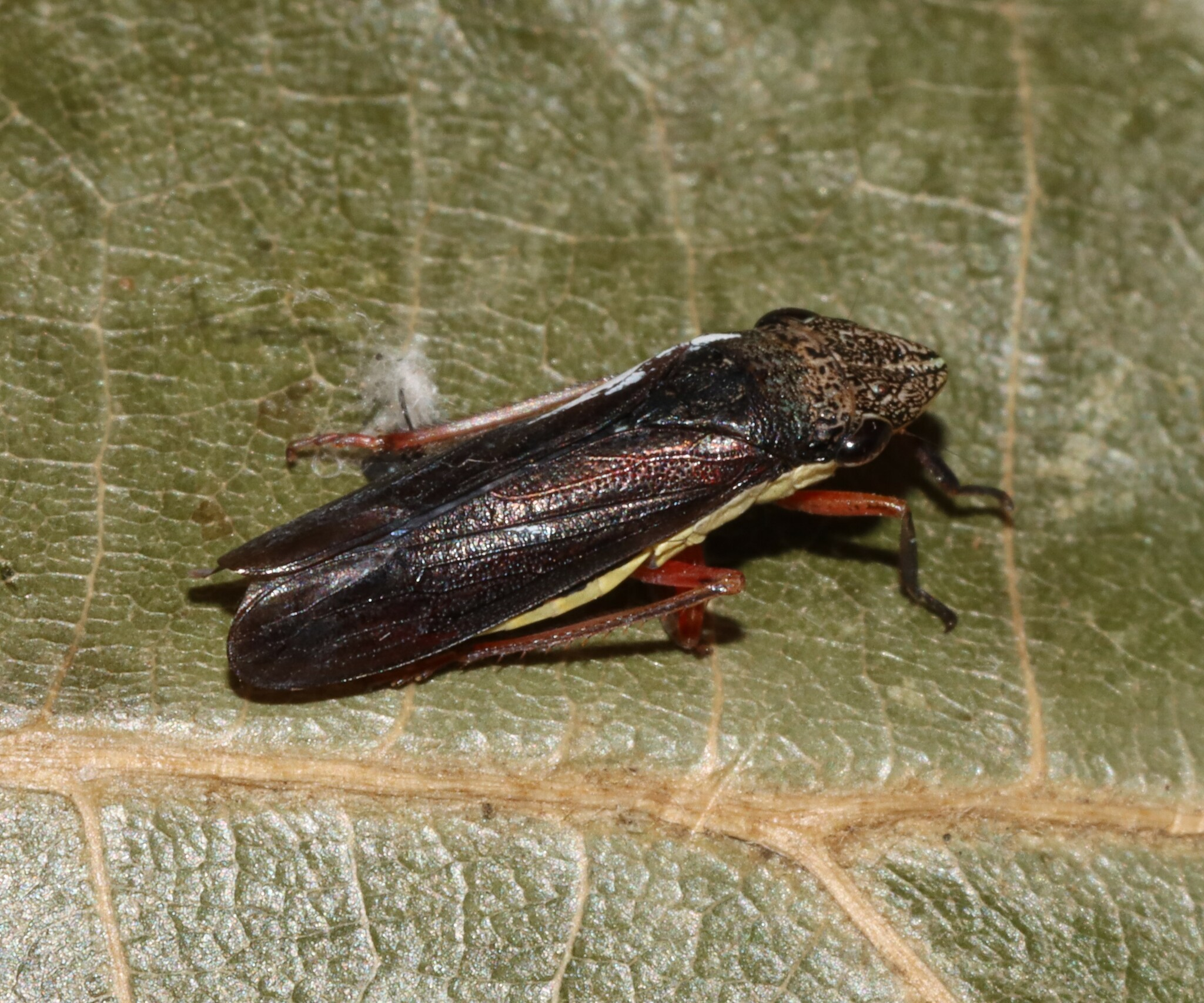
- Homalodisca insolita, johnsongrass sharpshooter, Arkansas

Scientific classification
- Kingdom: Animalia
- Phylum: Arthropoda
- Clade: Pancrustacea
- Class: Insecta
- Order: Hemiptera
- Suborder: Auchenorrhyncha
- Family: Cicadellidae
- Subfamily: Cicadellinae
- Tribe: Proconiini
- Genus: Homalodisca
- Species: H. insolita

Binomial name
- Homalodisca insolita (Walker, 1858)

Synonyms
- Phera atrata Fowler, 1899; Phera insolita (Walker, 1858); Proconia insoleta Walker, 1858; Proconia insolita Walker, 1858

= Homalodisca insolita =

Species of insect

Homalodisca insolita, the johnsongrass sharpshooter, is a species of sharpshooter in the family Cicadellidae. It is found in southern North America. It has been identified as a vector of Xylella fastidiosa, a crop-damaging bacterium, and it has been recorded spreading northwards into the south-eastern United States.
