= Brochosome =

Microscopic granules secreted by leafhoppers

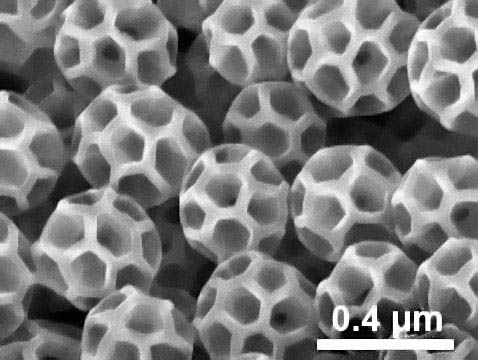
The most common brochosomes

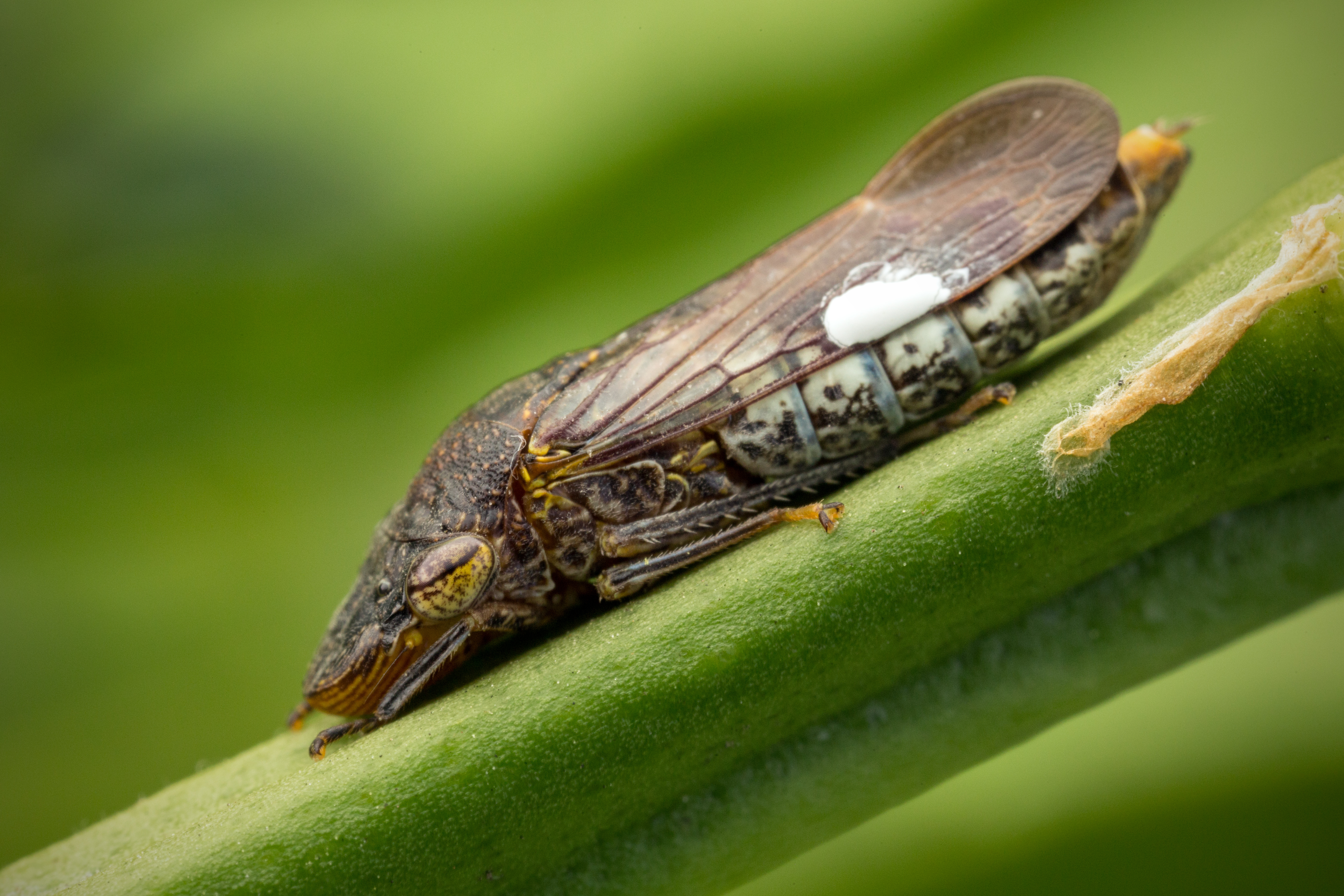
A female Homalodisca vitripennis carries on her wings masses of specialized brochosomes (the white spot) to be used during egg-laying.

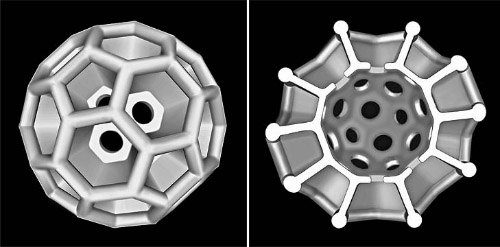
A model of a single leafhopper brochosome (left), and a cross section of it showing its reticular nature.

Brochosomes are intricately structured microscopic granules secreted by leafhoppers (the family Cicadellidae of the insect order Hemiptera) and typically found on their body surface and, more rarely, eggs. Brochosomes were first described in 1952 with the aid of an electron microscope. Brochosomes are hydrophobic and help keep the insect cuticle clean. These particles have also been found in samples of air and can easily contaminate foreign objects, which explains erroneous reports of brochosomes on other insects.

The name, derived from the Greek words βρóχoς ("brochos": mesh of a net) and σωμα ("soma": body), refers to the characteristic reticulated surface of the granules.

Brochosomes exhibit superhydrophobic and antireflective properties, and recently, mimicking the brochosome's antireflective and superhydrophobic properties has become a point of interest among researchers. Many of these interested researchers have developed methods of synthesizing brochosome-like structures for biomimetic applications.

== Structure and Composition ==
Most species of leafhoppers produce hollow spherical brochosomes, 0.2–0.7 micrometers in diameter, with a honeycombed outer wall. They often consist of 20 hexagonal and 12 pentagonal cells, making the outline of each brochosome approximating a truncated icosahedron – the geometry of a soccer ball and a C_{60} buckminsterfullerene molecule. The geometry of these brochosomes varies depending on species, with many features such as diameter, ridges, holes and bottoms having variable structure between species The chemical composition of brochosomes includes several kinds of proteins and, according to some studies, lipids.

Brochosomal proteins occur in two major categories: Brochosomins (BSM) and Brochosome Associated Proteins (BSAP). Brochosomins serve as the primary structural protein component of the brochosome, whereas BSAP proteins contain a variety of cyclase-like proteins as well as poly-proline helices. Brochosomins are noted for having a high structural amount of glycine, tyrosine, and cysteine. It is speculated that glycine contributes to the structure of brochosomes, as high glycine content is found in many structural proteins such as collagen and keratin. The same is said of cysteine through disulfide cross linking, with evenly spaced units throughout the peptides, possibly providing stability to the structure. These proteins identified in the composition of brochosomes and their corresponding genes show no relationship to proteins and genes of any organisms outside of Membracoidea and thus are considered to be examples of orphan genes.

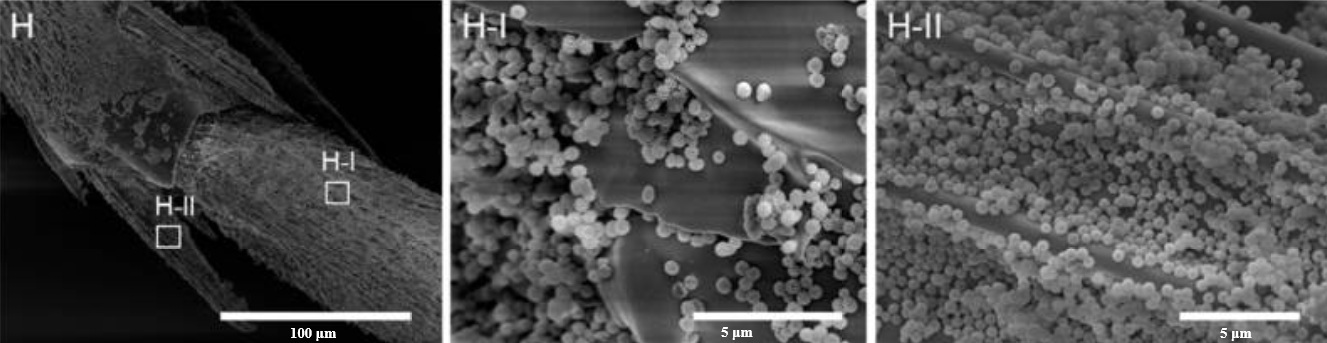
Electron Micrograph of Hind Leg of M. Dorsalis Leafhopper at 100 μm (Left), with Two Sections Displaying Brochosome Distribution on Hind Leg at 5 μm (Middle, Right)

These hollow spheres are distributed in coatings with varying densities and distributions across the surface of the leafhopper's forewing. This coating leads to surface roughness on the insect. This microscopic roughness due to the coating is then compounded with roughness as a result of the net-like structure of the individual brochosome. The granules form a powdery coating on the surface of the insect's body creating a high degree of contact and hence superhydrophobic properties.

== Origin ==
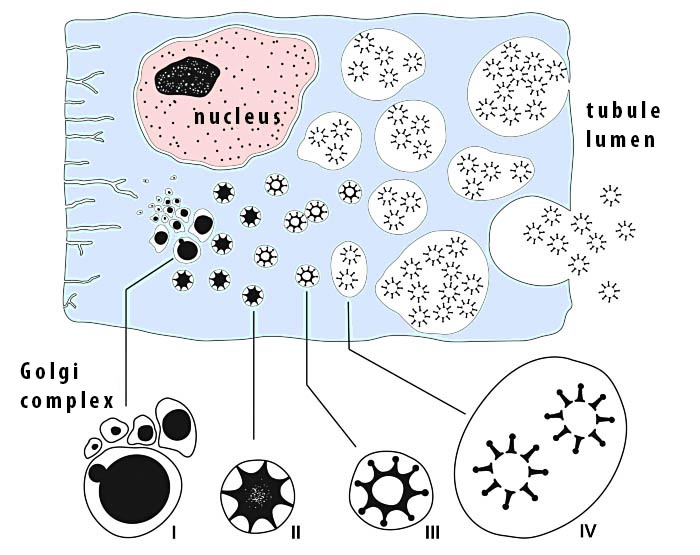
Development of brochosomes (stages I to IV) in a secretory cell.

Brochosomes are produced within cells of specialized glandular segments of the Malpighian tubules – the primary excretory organs of insects, which often serve additional functions. Each cell simultaneously manufactures a large number of brochosomes within its Golgi complexes and eventually releases them into the lumen of the tubule.

== Functions ==
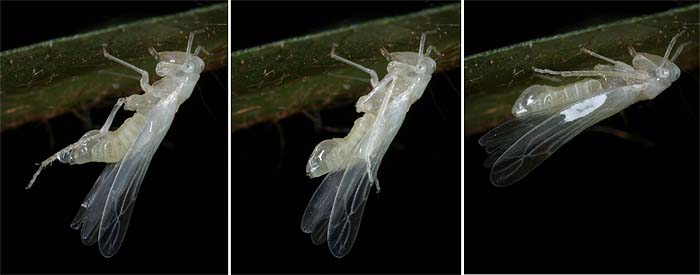
A freshly molted female of Igutettix oculatus (Ldb.) uses its hind tibiae to transfer brochosome-containing secretory droplets from the anus (left) onto the forewings (middle), where the sediment of brochosomes dries as a pair of white spots (right), sometimes erroneously referred to as "wax areas".

After each molt, most leafhopper species release droplets of the brochosome-containing fluid through the anus and actively spread them over the newly formed integument. This behavior is called anointing. Dry brochosomes are further distributed across the body and appendages in repeated bouts of grooming, in which leafhoppers scrub themselves with their legs. The transport of brochosomes is facilitated by groups and rows of strong setae on the legs. The resulting coat makes the integument highly repellent to water (superhydrophobic) and to the leafhopper's own liquid excreta, the latter often being sugary and sticky, and thus potentially dangerous for the insect. Additional protective functions of the brochosomal coating have been hypothesized. For example, there is evidence that the anti reflective property of brochosome make surfaces coated by it appear similar to a leaf in the eyes of insects thus it can be used as camouflage for the eggs.

In several New World genera of the leafhopper subfamily Cicadellinae (including the glassy-winged sharpshooter and related species) brochosomes are also used as a coating on egg masses. In gravid females from these genera, the Malpighian tubules switch over from production of regular brochosomes, described above, to production of larger, typically elongate particles, up to 20 micrometres in length. Prior to laying eggs, the female places masses of such brochosomes onto its forewings, and later scrapes them off onto the freshly laid eggs with its hindlegs. The resulting powdery coat may serve various protective functions, including protection against egg-parasitoids from the order Hymenoptera (Chalcidoidea). The shape and sculpture of such "egg" brochosomes can vary significantly among species, providing additional characteristics for species identification.

== Synthetic Brochosomes ==
=== Cell-Free Gene Expression ===
Many studies utilizing naturally occurring brochosomes often face limitations due to its sensitivity to a redox environment and difficulty to harvest. One method scientists are developing to remedy this problem is through the development of cell-free gene expression (CFE) systems that would be utilized to create an optimized in vitro brochosome production system. CFE systems allow for rapid prototyping and control of various biological conditions and reactions that allow for the prototyping of biochemical systems like metabolism, protein expression, and more. Utilizing this system, scientists hope to utilize brochosome proteins from H. vitripennis and express them in the CFE system using E. coli based CFE settings to determine disulfide bond isomerase concentration, reaction temperature, and redox reactions that will lead to increased brochosome yield.

== Synthetic Biomimetic Materials ==
Scientists and engineers are currently attempting to produce synthetic, brochosome-like structures for various material applications, as synthetic brochosomes have the potential for anti-reflective and superhydrophobic properties, among others. Synthesis methods employed by current research often involve using self-assembly to form some kind of template or structure using non-protein materials, then using those structures to assemble component proteins into brochosome. Precise spacing/order and size of the brochosome seems to be required in order to successfully achieve antireflective and superhydrophobic properties. There are many methods that are currently being developed, among which are colloidal crystal templating and droplet assembly.

=== Colloidal Crystal Templating ===
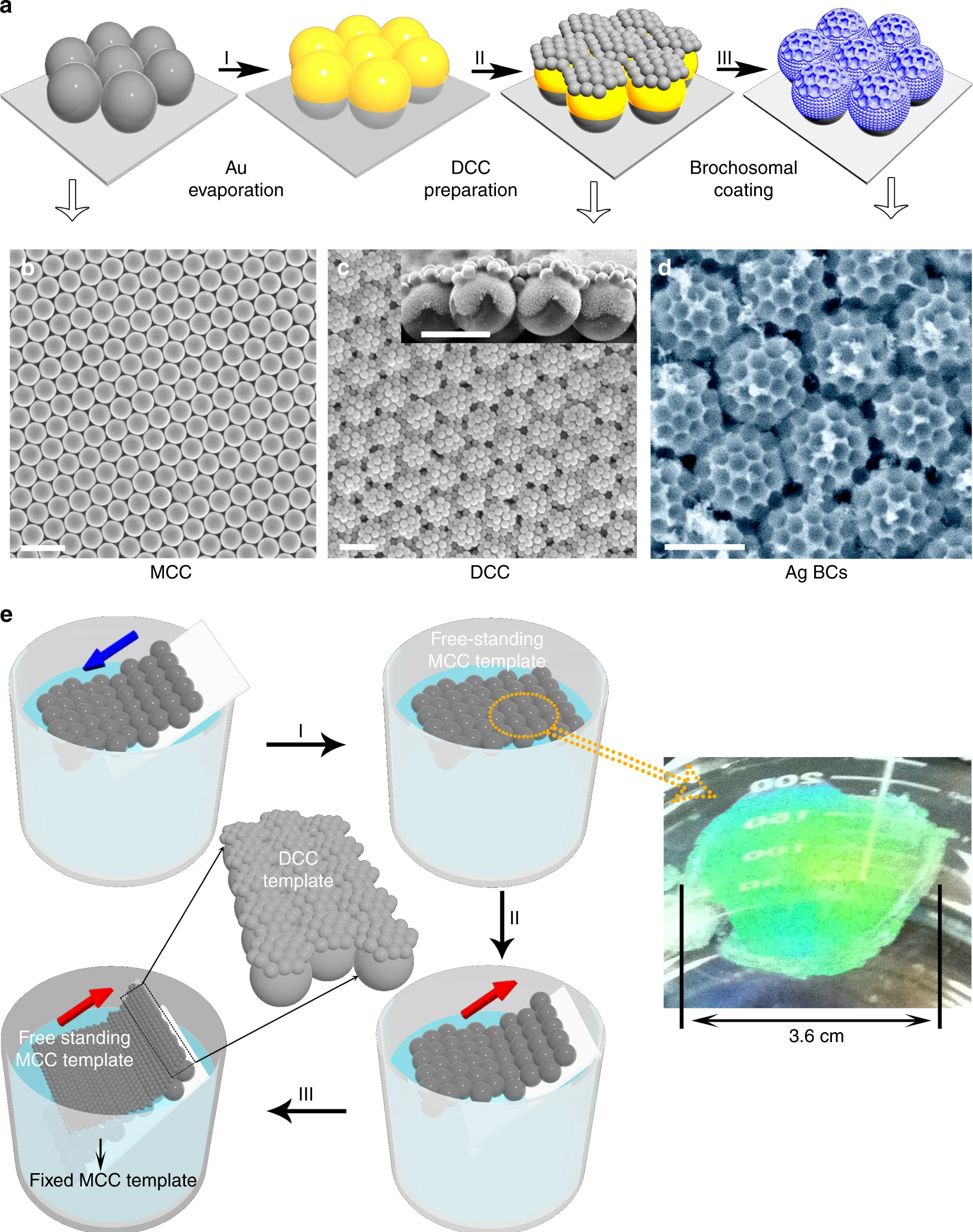
Illustration of one permutation of the double-layer colloidal crystal (DCC) templating method

In double layer colloidal crystal templating, a layer of polymer spheres is coated in a layer of conducting particles (by sputtering, for example). Those spheres are then coated in a layer of smaller spheres. The polymer is then dissolved using a solvent and washed away. The metal particles hold the shape of the polymer spheres, creating a template (a sphere with spherical indentations on the surface). Metal, or other conducting material, is used to create the template when an electroplating/electro-deposition method is used to deposit the materials used to make up the synthetic brochosome itself.

This idea of depositing colloids to form a template is also modified as a cast-molding procedure. Instead of coating a larger sphere with conducting particles, those larger spheres are used to create indents in a different material that will form the base of the template. Spheres are dropped in a resin or adjacent material, which is then cured to preserve the shape of the spherical indents. The spheres are then removed, leaving the indents behind. Smaller spheres are then used to coat the spherical indents, and the gaps between the smaller spheres are filled in by a third material. The smaller spheres are then removed, leaving the template of a large spherical indent coated in smaller spherical ones.

=== In-Situ Precursor Transformation Technique ===
An emerging technique to produce closed pore brochosomes is through utilizing and in situ precursor transformation technique. Scientists deposit a layer of dicyandiamide that conformed a surface of porous silica beads. These beads are then heated at very high temperatures otherwise known as calcination to obtain polymeric carbon nitride (PCN) particles after the removal of the silica bead template.

The brochosomes of this method are stated to exhibit hierarchal properties and better light absorption properties under the visible light spectrum, with a diameter of approximately 387 nanometers.

=== Modified Droplet Assembly ===
Another revised version of the droplet method made by Si et al has been reported to have created brochosomes with a diameter of approximately 530 nanometers with pores similar to natural brochosomes.

In this method an oil emulsion is made and through the addition of surfactants and silica precursor solution, oil droplets were clustered together through surface charge interactions and mechanical agitation through stirring. The silica nanoparticles from the precursor solution are then formed along the surface of each oil drop. The silica brochosome-like particles are then collected from the solution through centrifugation and freezing with liquid nitrogen. The brochosomes of this method were reported to exhibit superhydrophobicity and antireflective properties.

By utilizing solvents with different levels of water miscibility, different morphologies of brochosomes can be produced. Water-immiscible solvents were found to create porous particles and vice versa when using water miscible solvents.

=== Solvent-Mediated Polymerization-Induced Self-Assembly (PISA) ===
Another method that has been in development by Liu et al. utilizes PISA, a process utilizing a protein catalyzed agent, to increase the amount of hydrogen bonding with the block copolymers, oil droplets, and polyphenol in the water/ethanol solvent utilized in the production of brochosomes. Through this method the pore sizes were controllable within the range of 95 to 227 nanometers with mesopore sizes being controllable within the range of 9 to 50 nanometers. This is method typically produces mesoporous N-doped carbon synthetic brochosomes.

=== Droplet-Based Microfluidic Platform ===
Another new droplet-based microfluidic platform has recently been under study in regard to a platform that can assure the continuous and high-quality production of synthetic brochosomes. This platform functions by mimicking the same conditions of the Malpighian tubules where the brochosome are formed. A solvent containing amphiphilic block copolymers and surfactants are suspended in water droplets, which through surface-tension effects, self-assemble into brochosomal structures after solvent evaporation. With this method nanometer-scale resolution monodispersed and polydispersed brochosomes with diverse geometries can be produced at a rate of 10^{5} particles per second.

By adjusting the ratios of hydrophobic and hydrophilic sites on the utilized block copolymer the surface-tension effects that drive the self-assembly of the brochosome can be adjusted to emulate five common morphologies of natural brochosomes.

== Applications ==
The unique structure of brochosomes have often been used as inspiration for biomimetic materials with applications in biomedical engineering, optical materials, information storage, and surface engineering.

Brochosome structures can be adapted for many different materials like gold, nickel, manganese dioxide, and polypyrrole. A material made out of brochosome structures could help out with sensors, cameras, and telescopes by altering the light reflection and light capture. In the biomedical field current research hopes to create sensors based on brochosomes for detecting specific bacteria and proteins. Additionally, experts have proposed usage of brochosomes inspired particle surfaces for targeted drug delivery systems, where the particle surfaces could be used to transport specific drugs to their intended tissues.

Synthetic brochosomes can be used for hiding thermal signatures for humans or machines by regulating the light reflection of a surface. This could lead to making a thermal invisibility cloak. The lab-made brochosomes can reduce light reflection up to 94% using hollow particles. Because brochosomes can absorb UV lights, future applications could lead to solar energy harvesting that is more efficient, preventing damage from the sun to pharmaceuticals by making a coating, making better sunscreen, or even creating a cloaking device. Applications that have been explored were creating an encryption system where data can only be seen in specific light wavelengths using structures similar to brochosomes. The optical and photonic properties have motivated the development of biomimetic materials for many applications from invisible cloaking devices to solar cell coatings. Further research is expected to lead towards developing an invisibility cloak that could be used for military purposes.

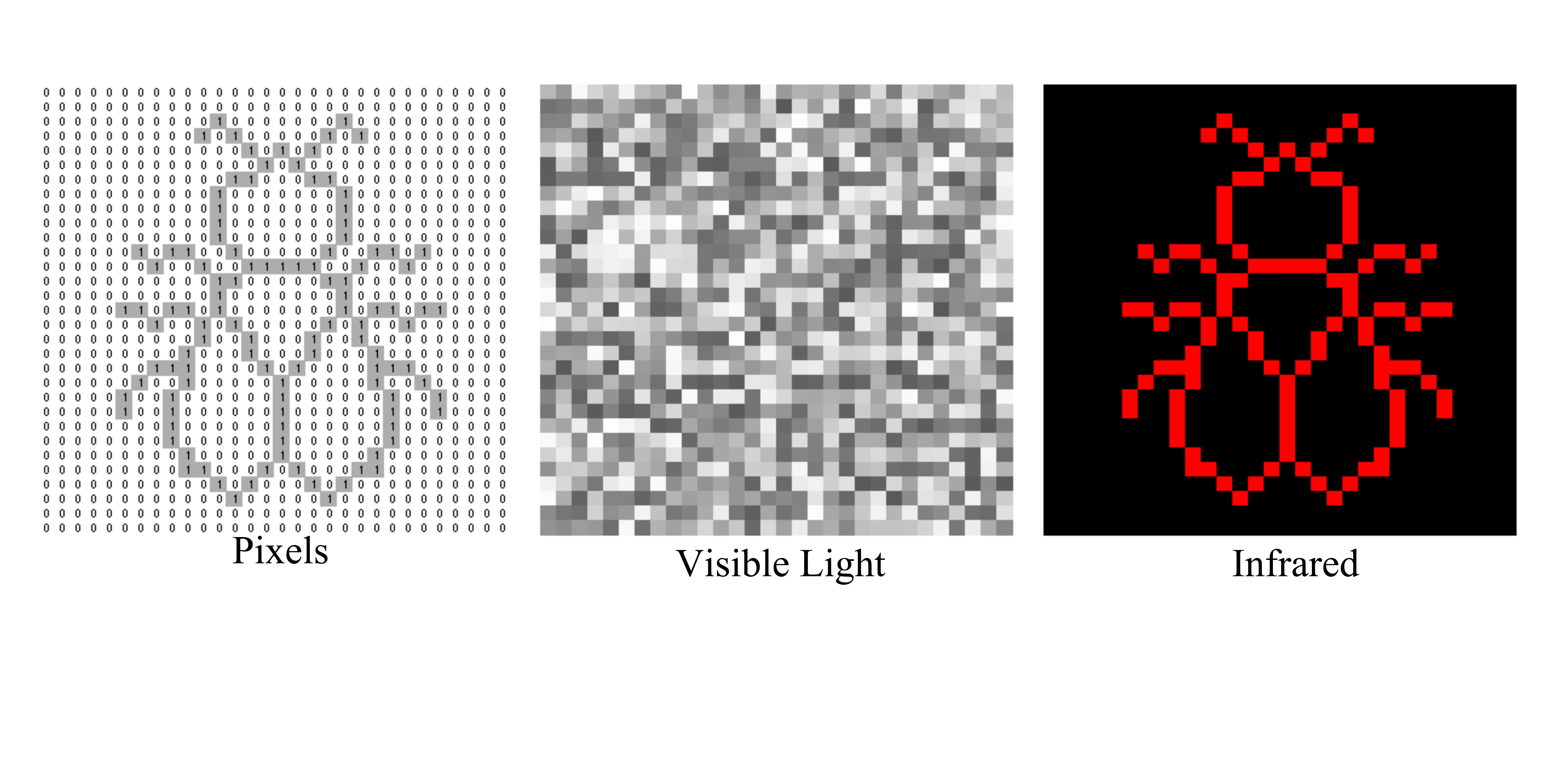
A diagram describing how the brochosomes inspired binary meta structures function.

Particularly the reflective properties of brochosomes could be used to camouflage thermal signatures. Studies also have explored reversibly tunable antireflective coatings, that increased visible light transmission and antireflection. Brochosomes have also been looked at as inspiration for omnidirectional antireflective coatings, light absorbing materials, and multispectral camouflage.

Brochosomes have also been studied for information storage. Due to the different optical properties of brochosomes under visible and infrared light, new meta structures have emerged for encoding. These meta structures in the visible range look identical while in the infrared there is a difference in energy allowing for visibility. This technique has been used to create microscopic QR codes that are less than 2% of an inch. Some other applications being explored are anti-counterfeiter measures, information encryption, and usage for banknotes.

The surfaces of brochosomes have also inspired the development of super amphiphobic materials. The non-wetting behavior of brochosomes is being used to fabricate more advanced surfaces.
