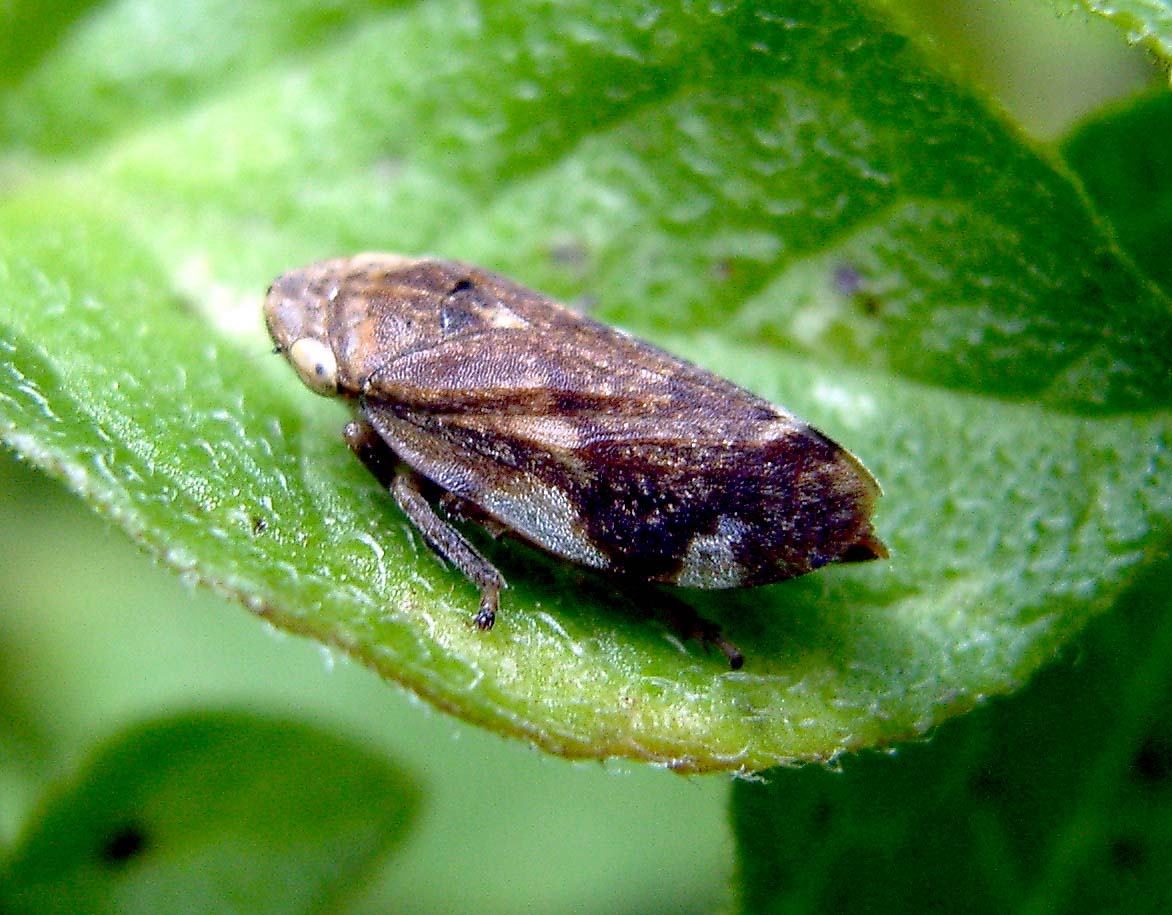
- Philaenus spumarius

Scientific classification
- Kingdom: Animalia
- Phylum: Arthropoda
- Clade: Pancrustacea
- Class: Insecta
- Order: Hemiptera
- Suborder: Auchenorrhyncha
- Family: Aphrophoridae
- Genus: Philaenus; Stål, 1864

Species
- 8, see text

= Philaenus =

Genus of true bugs

Philaenus is a genus of insects belonging to the family Aphrophoridae, the spittlebugs.

The meadow spittlebug Philaenus spumarius is a common insect in much of the Northern Hemisphere, and it is sometimes a pest on crops such as alfalfa. It is important to science because its entire genome has been sequenced. It has also been the subject of many studies of genetic diversity because it displays marked color polymorphism. There are sixteen color phenotypes, with individuals taking various dark, pale, mottled, and striped patterns. Most other Philaenus species are also color polymorphic.

Many species are polyphagous, feeding on a number of plants. Some species specialize on one host plant, the common asphodel (Asphodelus aestivus).

There are eight species in the genus.

- Philaenus arslani
- Philaenus italosignus
- Philaenus loukasi
- Philaenus maghresignus
- Philaenus signatus
- Philaenus spumarius – meadow spittlebug
- Philaenus tarifa
- Philaenus tesselatus
