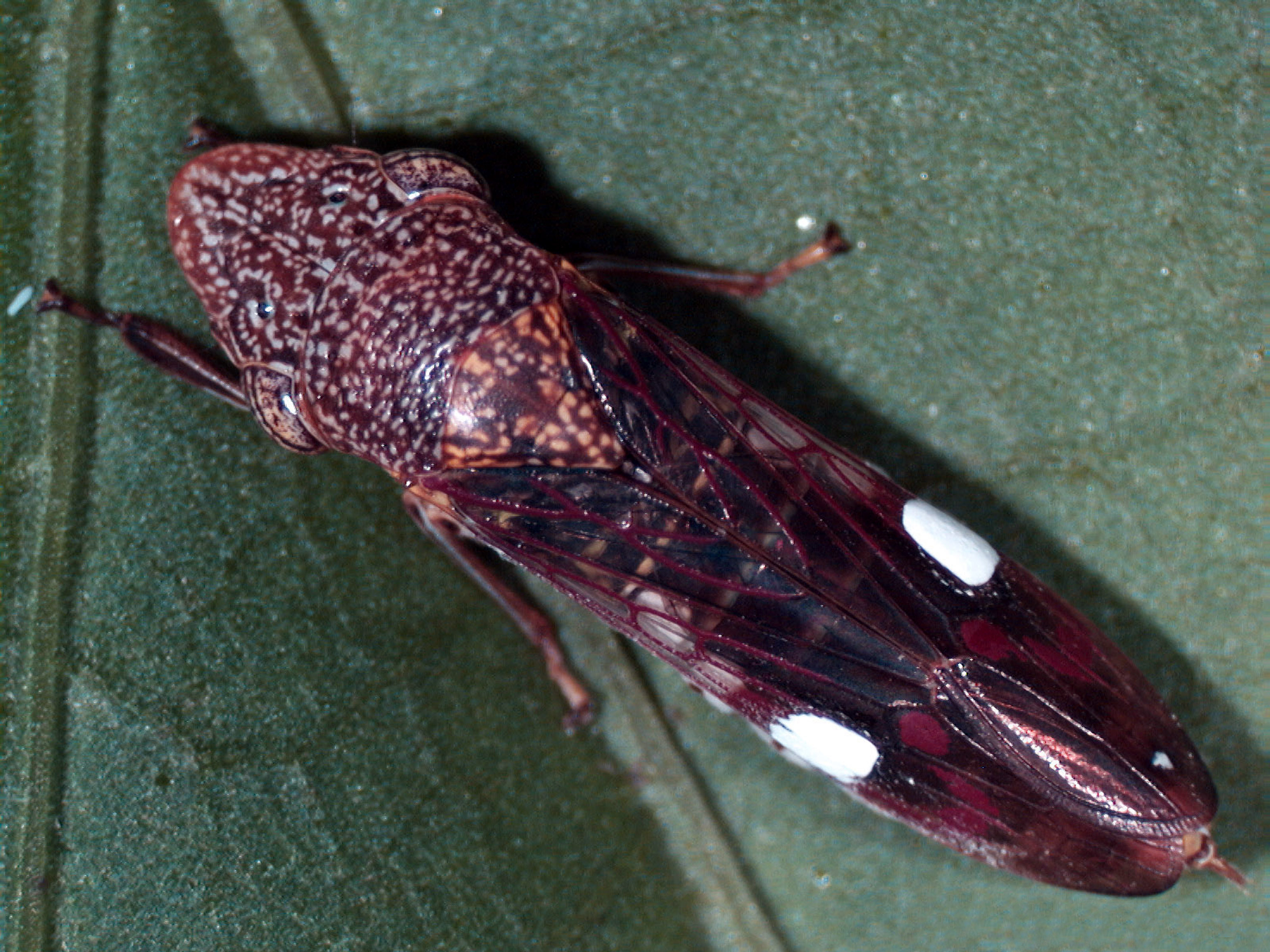
- Homalodisca vitripennis

Scientific classification
- Domain: Eukaryota
- Kingdom: Animalia
- Phylum: Arthropoda
- Class: Insecta
- Order: Hemiptera
- Suborder: Auchenorrhyncha
- Family: Cicadellidae
- Subfamily: Cicadellinae
- Tribe: Proconiini
- Genus: Homalodisca; Stål, 1869

= Homalodisca =

Genus of leafhoppers

Homalodisca is a genus of sharpshooters in the family Cicadellidae and tribe Proconiini. It contains a significant pest species, the glassy-winged sharpshooter.

== Species ==
The Catalogue of Life lists:

- Homalodisca admittens
- Homalodisca apicalis
- Homalodisca cornuta
- Homalodisca elongata
- Homalodisca excludens
- Homalodisca hambletoni
- Homalodisca ichthyocephala
- Homalodisca ignorata
- Homalodisca ignota
- Homalodisca indefensa
- Homalodisca insolita
- Homalodisca liturata
- Homalodisca lucernaria
- Homalodisca nitida
- Homalodisca noressa
- Homalodisca robusta
- Homalodisca spottii
- Homalodisca vitripennis

== Gallery ==
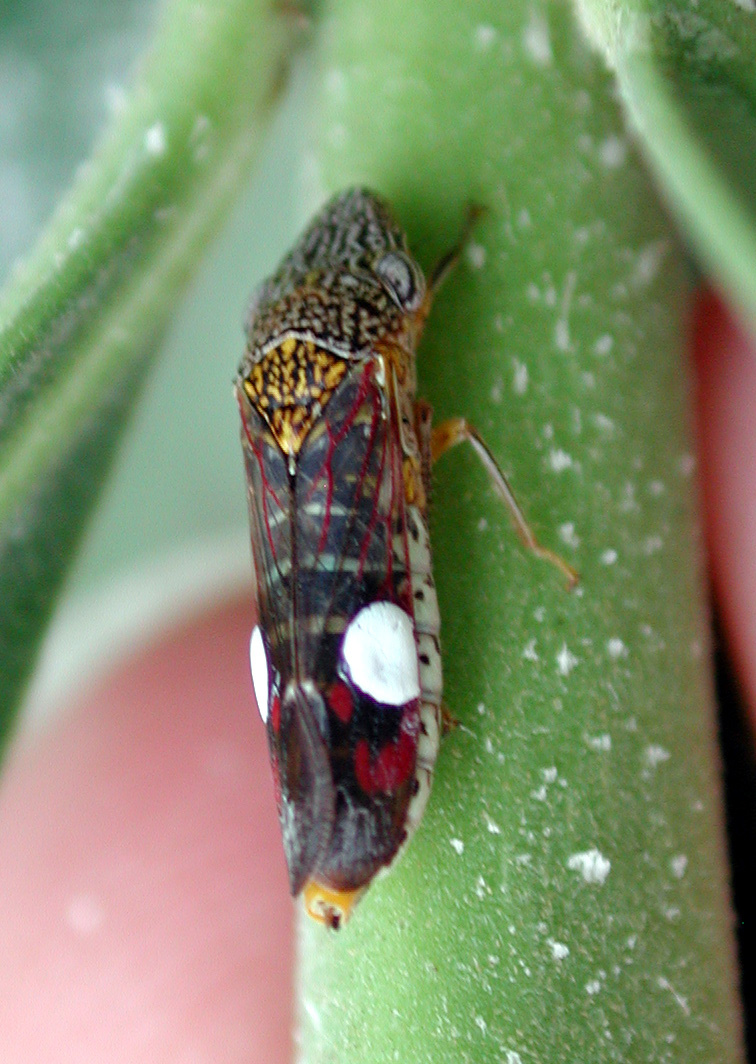

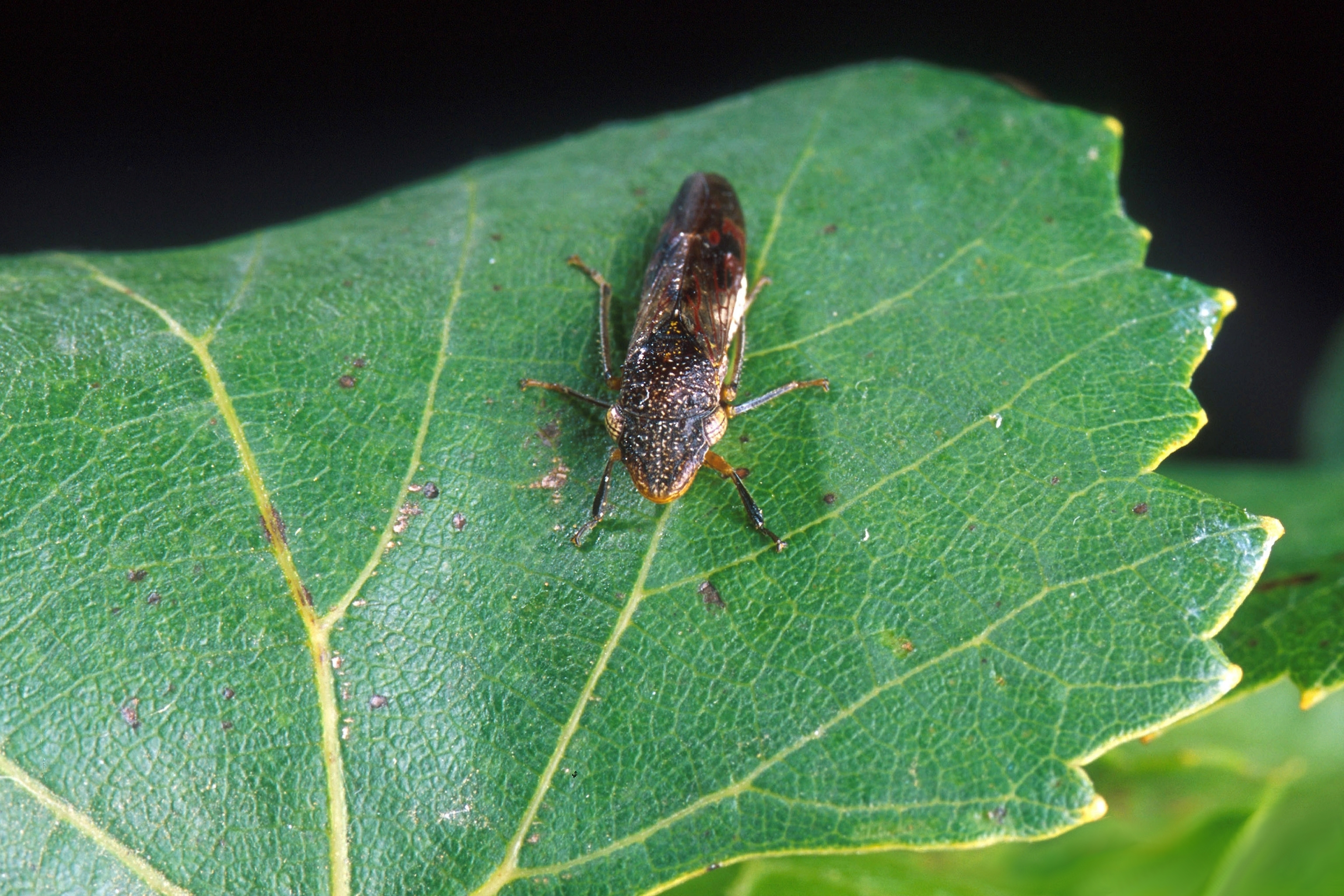

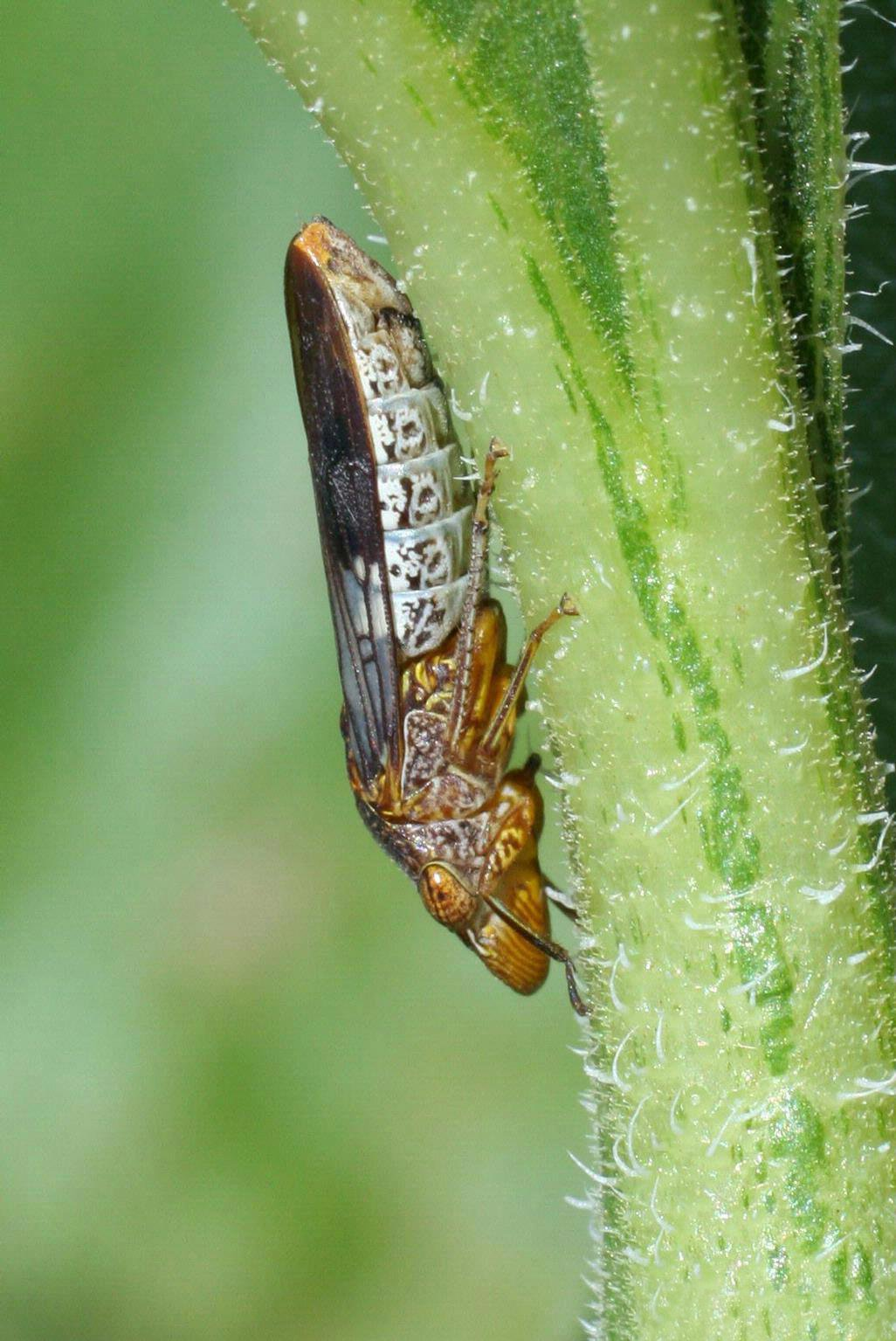

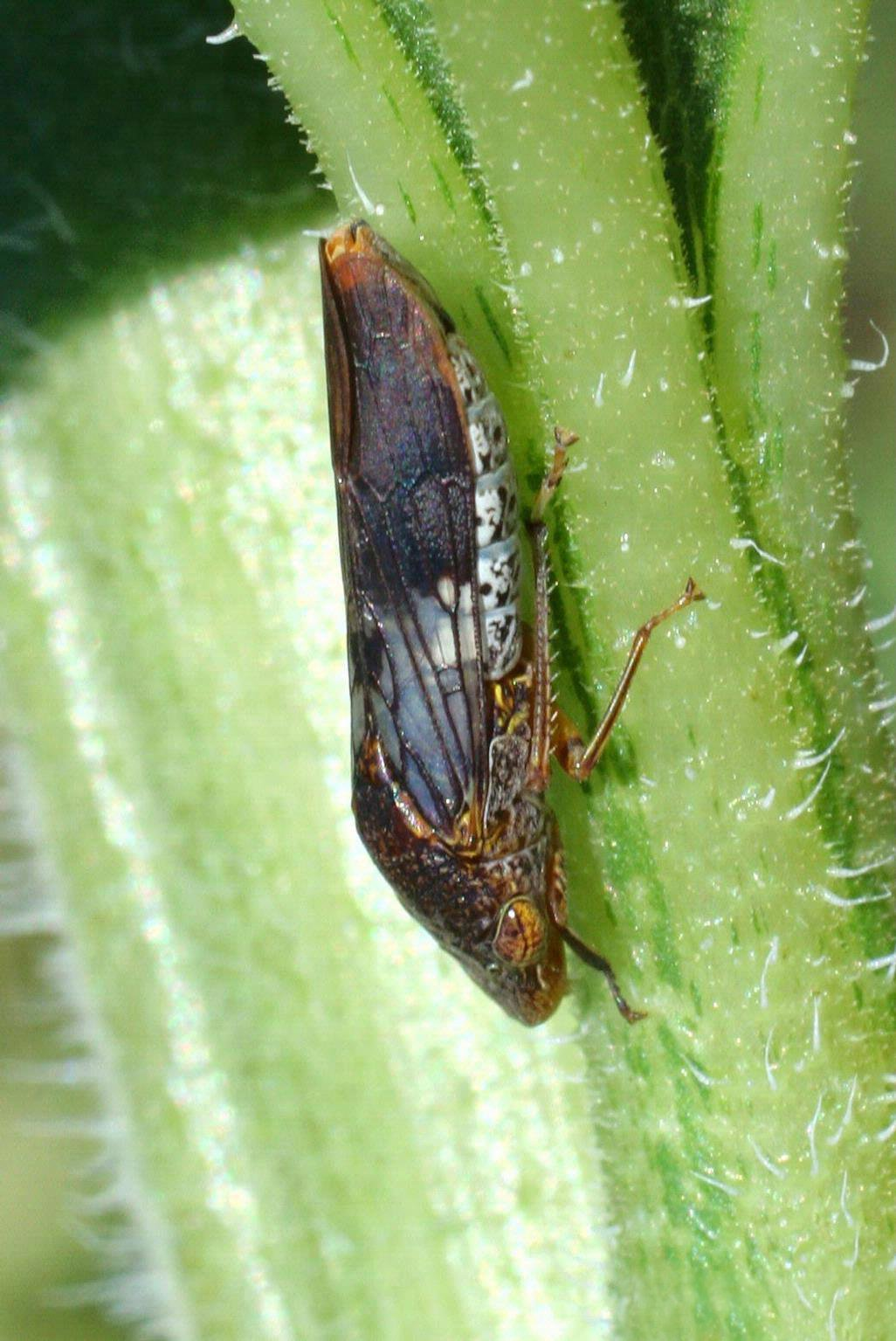
