= Olive quick decline syndrome =

Disease of olive trees

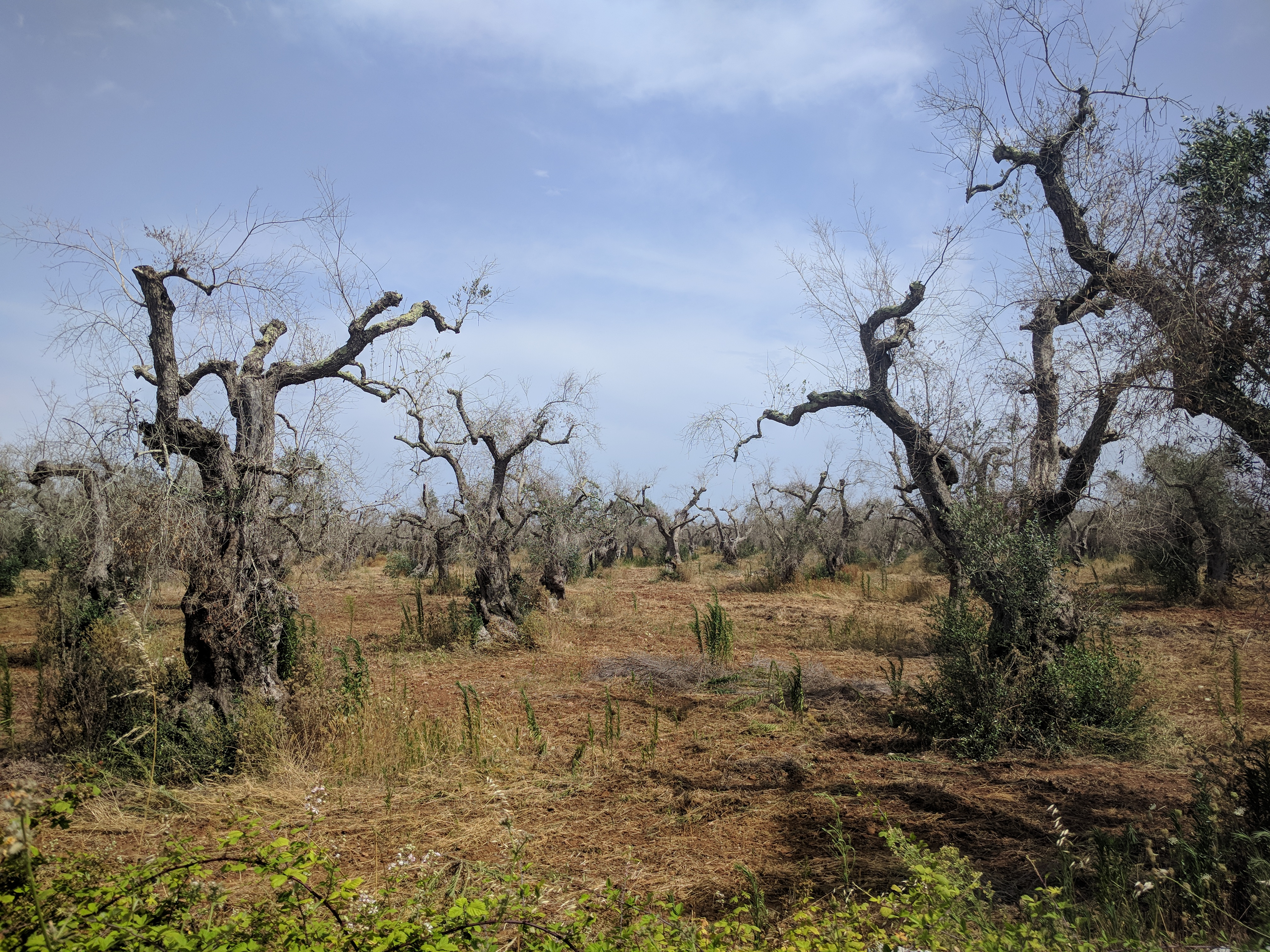
- An olive grove infested with Xylella fastidiosa in Apulia, Italy in 2019
- Common names: OQDS
- Causal agents: Xylella fastidiosa
- Hosts: Olive trees
- Vectors: Meadow froghopper
- Distribution: Southern Italy
- Symptoms: Dieback of the leaves, twigs and branches

Olive quick decline syndrome (in Italian: Complesso del Disseccamento Rapido dell'Olivo) is a wasting disease of olive trees which causes dieback of the leaves, twigs and branches so that the trees no longer produce crops of olives. The main cause is a strain of the bacterium, Xylella fastidiosa, which is spread by plant-sucking insects such as the meadow froghopper. The bacteria restrict the flow of sap within the tree and so choke its extremities.

== Impact ==
Biology of olive quick decline syndrome

The disease particularly affects olive groves. It was first detected in Southern Italy in 2013, in the Salento Peninsula; by late 2013, it was estimated that approximately 8,000 hectares were affected. As of 2020, the disease was threatening olive groves and oil production in Italy, Greece, and Spain, which together account for 95% of European oil production. One 2020 model predicts an economic impact of the disease for Italy over 50 years of between 1.9 billion to 5.6 billion Euros.

The disease has been detected in olive crops in California, Argentina and Brazil.

== Symptoms ==
Symptoms include leaf scorch and desiccation of twigs and branches, beginning at the upper part of the crown and then moving to the rest of the tree, which acquires a burned look.

== See also ==
- Citrus greening disease
- Xylella fastidiosa § Symptoms
