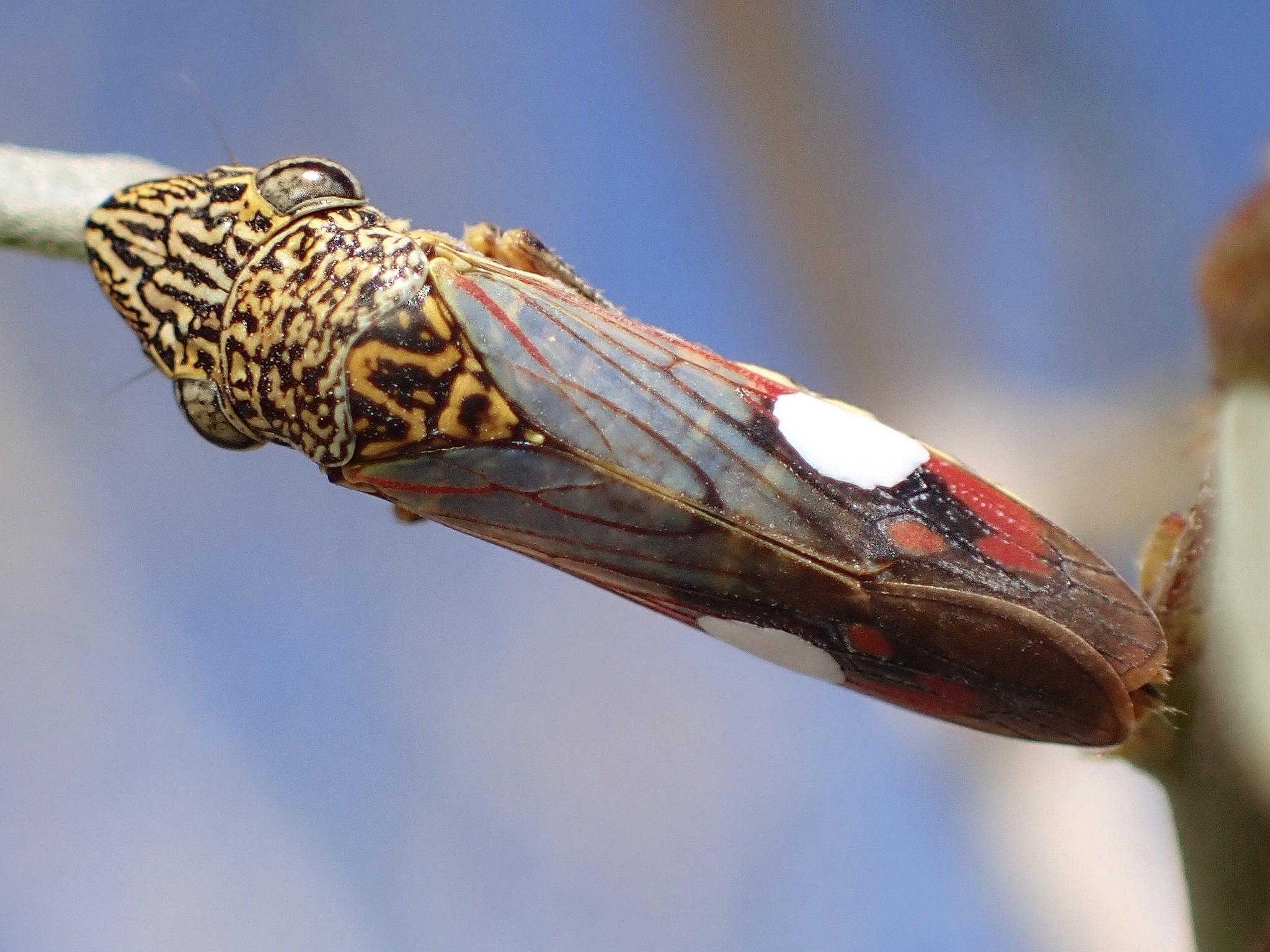

Scientific classification
- Kingdom: Animalia
- Phylum: Arthropoda
- Clade: Pancrustacea
- Class: Insecta
- Order: Hemiptera
- Suborder: Auchenorrhyncha
- Family: Cicadellidae
- Genus: Homalodisca
- Species: H. liturata

Binomial name
- Homalodisca liturata Ball, 1901

= Homalodisca liturata =

Species of leafhopper

Homalodisca liturata, also known as the smoketree sharpshooter or the lacertate sharpshooter, is a species of leafhopper native to North America. The smoketree sharpshooter uses a number of host species but prefers desert smoketree (Psorothamnus spinosus) where available. This is a comparatively large leafhopper at approximately 13 millimeters long. It, like other species in its genus, is a known vector of Xylella fastidiosa. Acoustic signaling is known to occur in both male and female smoketree sharpshooters.
