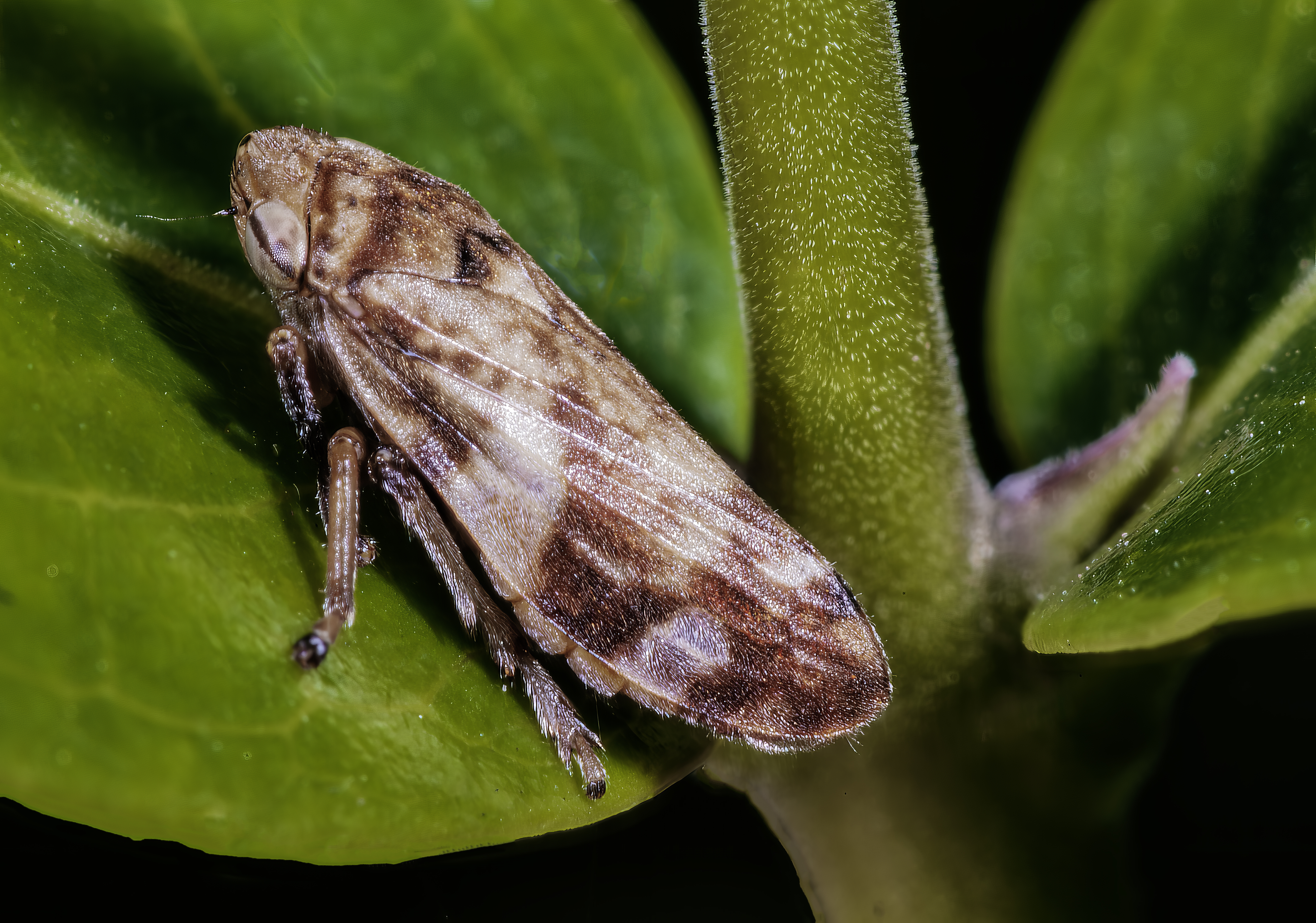
- Philaenus spumarius, upper side
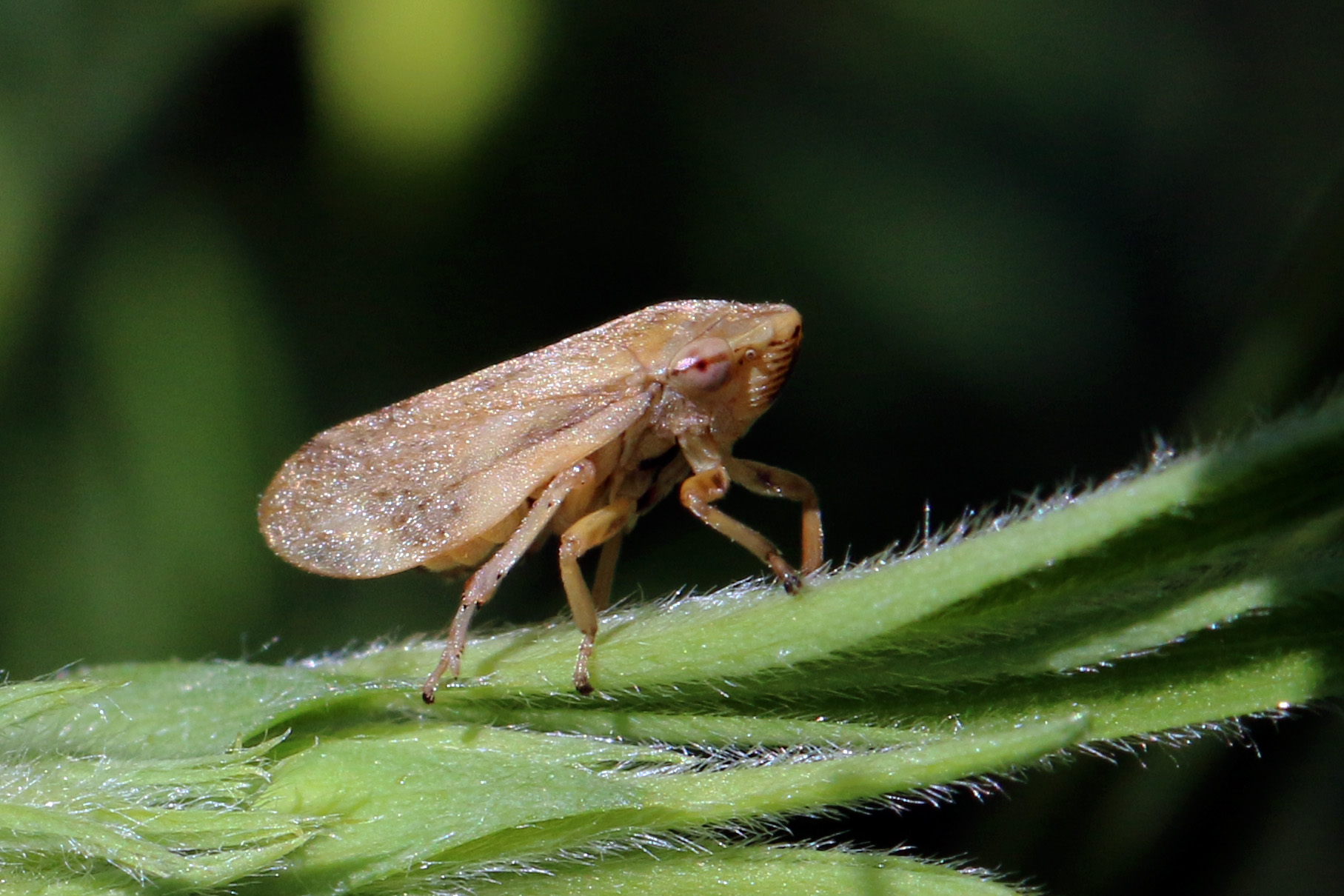
- Side view

Scientific classification
- Kingdom: Animalia
- Phylum: Arthropoda
- Clade: Pancrustacea
- Class: Insecta
- Order: Hemiptera
- Suborder: Auchenorrhyncha
- Family: Aphrophoridae
- Genus: Philaenus
- Species: P. spumarius

Binomial name
- Philaenus spumarius (Linnaeus, 1758)

= Philaenus spumarius =

Species of insect

Philaenus spumarius, the meadow froghopper or meadow spittlebug, is a species of insect belonging to the spittlebug family Aphrophoridae. In Italy and America, it is economically important as one of the vectors of Pierce's disease (Xylella fastidiosa).

== Distribution ==
Philaenus spumarius is quite common and widespread. The species' original distribution was restricted to the Palearctic realm. They are present in most of Europe, in North Africa, in part of Russia, in Afghanistan, and in Japan. They have also been introduced in North America.

This is a very eurytopic species, meaning that it can tolerate a wide range of environmental factors and exist in many different habitats (parks, meadows, gardens, etc.). It lives in almost all open land habitats and in open forests. It is absent only in very wet and very dry habitats.

Clip of mating pair

== Identification ==
The species reaches a body length of 5–7 millimetres (0.20–0.28 in). Most females are slightly larger than males. In these polymorphic insects, the coloration of the body is very variable (about 20 different color varieties are known). Usually, they are yellowish, brownish, or black, with brighter patches on a dark background, but also with dark markings on a lighter background.

== Locomotion ==
The most common modes of locomotion are running and flying, but the most striking is their strong jumping ability, which is useful for escaping from predators. When jumping, the hind leg tarsal spines and spine hairs are embedded into the material the animal is jumping from, typically a plant, and provide the purchase needed for a lateral jump - confirmed with scanning electron micrographs. X-ray spectroscopy revealed that the darker coloured sclerotized tips of the spines, the last 6/100ths of a millimetre or so, contain zinc.

== Life cycle ==
The seasonal nature, the phenology, of the species' life cycle varies because of the wide range of climatic conditions it can tolerate, but remains similar. In a temperate climate, the females lay eggs at the end of the summer. There are five instar larvae stages in the life span, after the egg hatching.

he eggs are laid singly or in groups (1 to 30, average 7) on the food plants of the larvae. Egg-laying is triggered by a single female, which can produce up to 350–400 eggs. In unfavorable climatic periods, froghoppers can survive in the form of eggs.

Eggs are approximately 1 mm long and 0.3 mm wide. They are white with an orange spot, which becomes darker and larger if the egg is fertilised. The larvae, also called nymphs, hatch after about 20 days and develop through five stages, known as instars.

The larvae are known for the self-generated foam masses that can be observed during spring in meadows (especially on cuckoo flowers, Cardamine pratensis, and broom, Genista, species). The larvae in the foam masses are largely protected from predators and also get the necessary moisture for the appropriate development and temperature, so their mortality remains low even in bad weather. The larval stage lasts about 50 days. The adults leave the foam mass only when it is completely dried. This takes about ten days. The females mate soon after.

Froghoppers are polyphagous, their host plant specificity is low, so that they can feed on a variety of plants, mainly grasses (Poaceae species), reed plants (Juncaceae species), herbs and sometimes trees (including the olive tree, where the species has been identified as spreading Xylella fastidiosa, the bacterium associated with Olive quick decline syndrome). They have been identified on over 1,300 host plant species, making them the most polyphagous insect known.

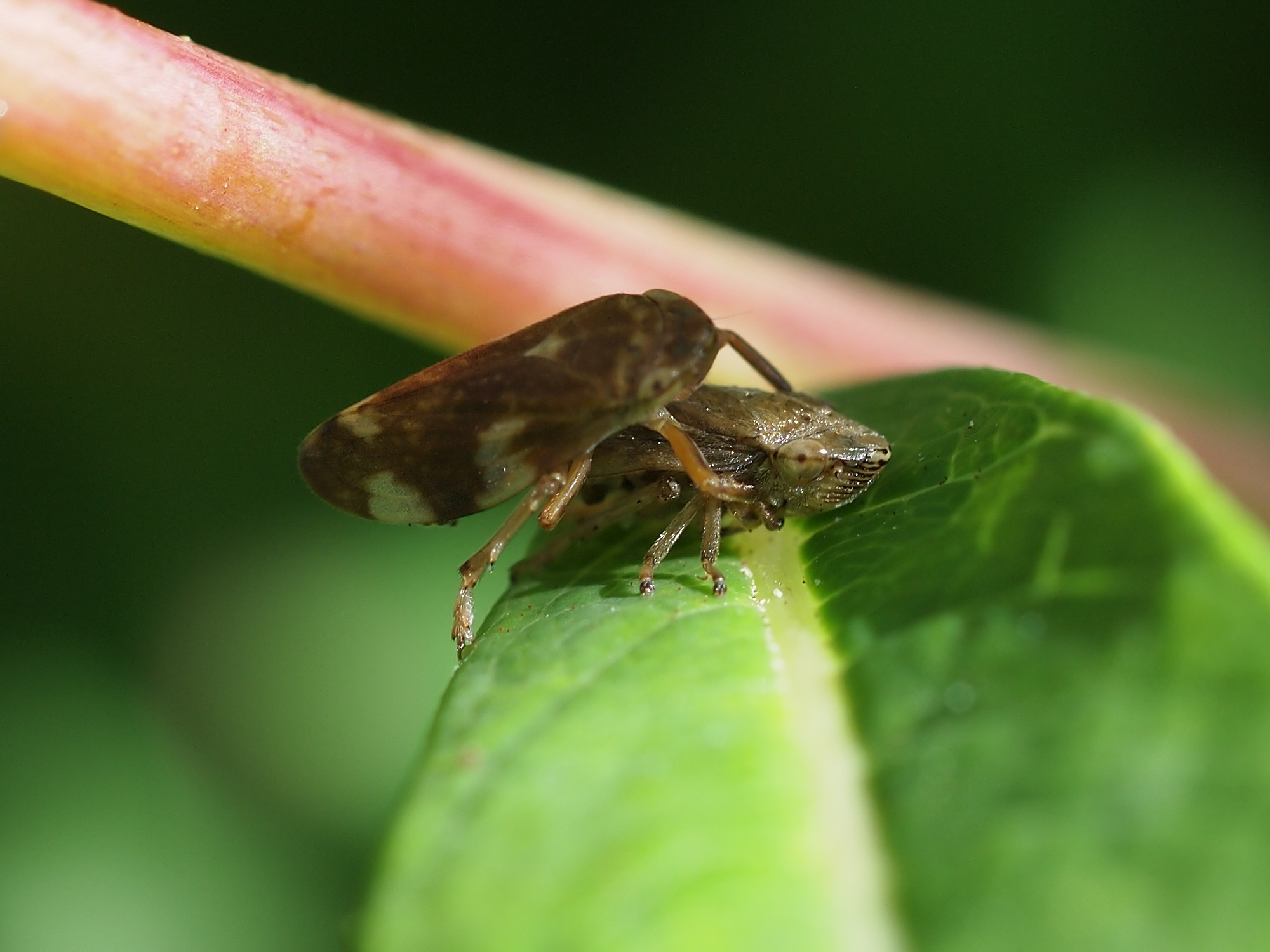
Mating

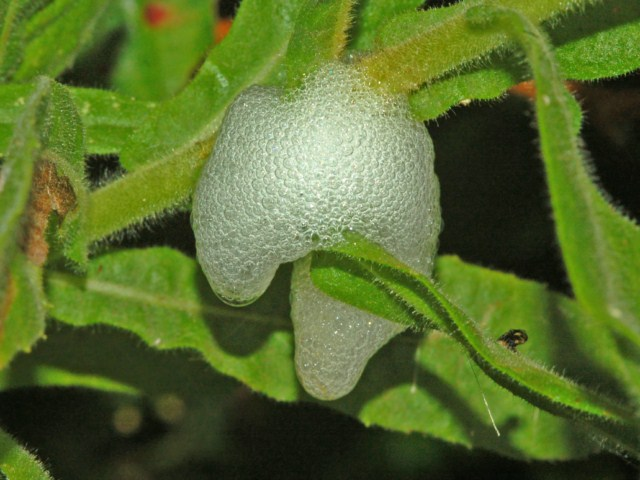
Foam mass

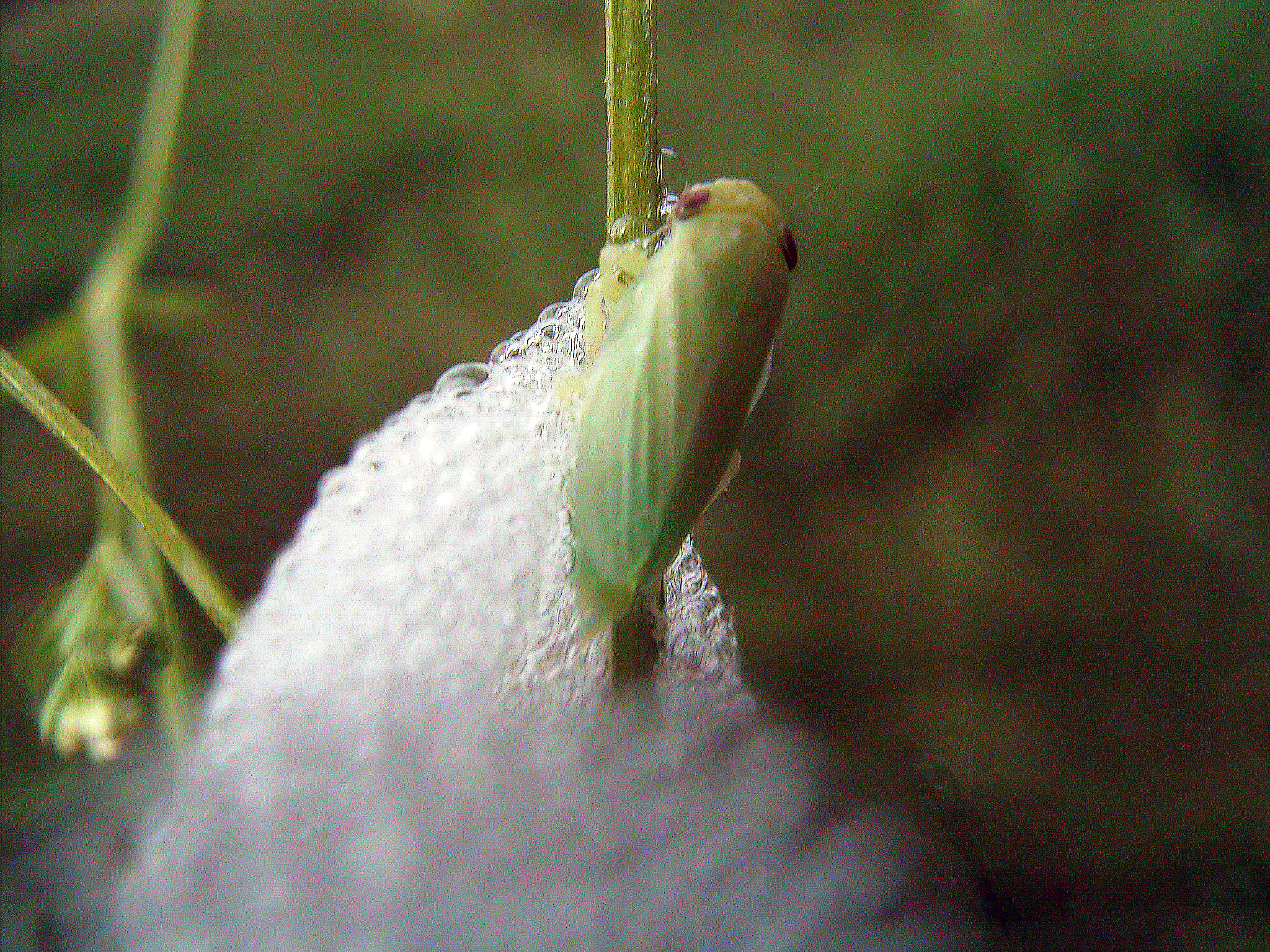
An adult, newly emerged from its foam mass

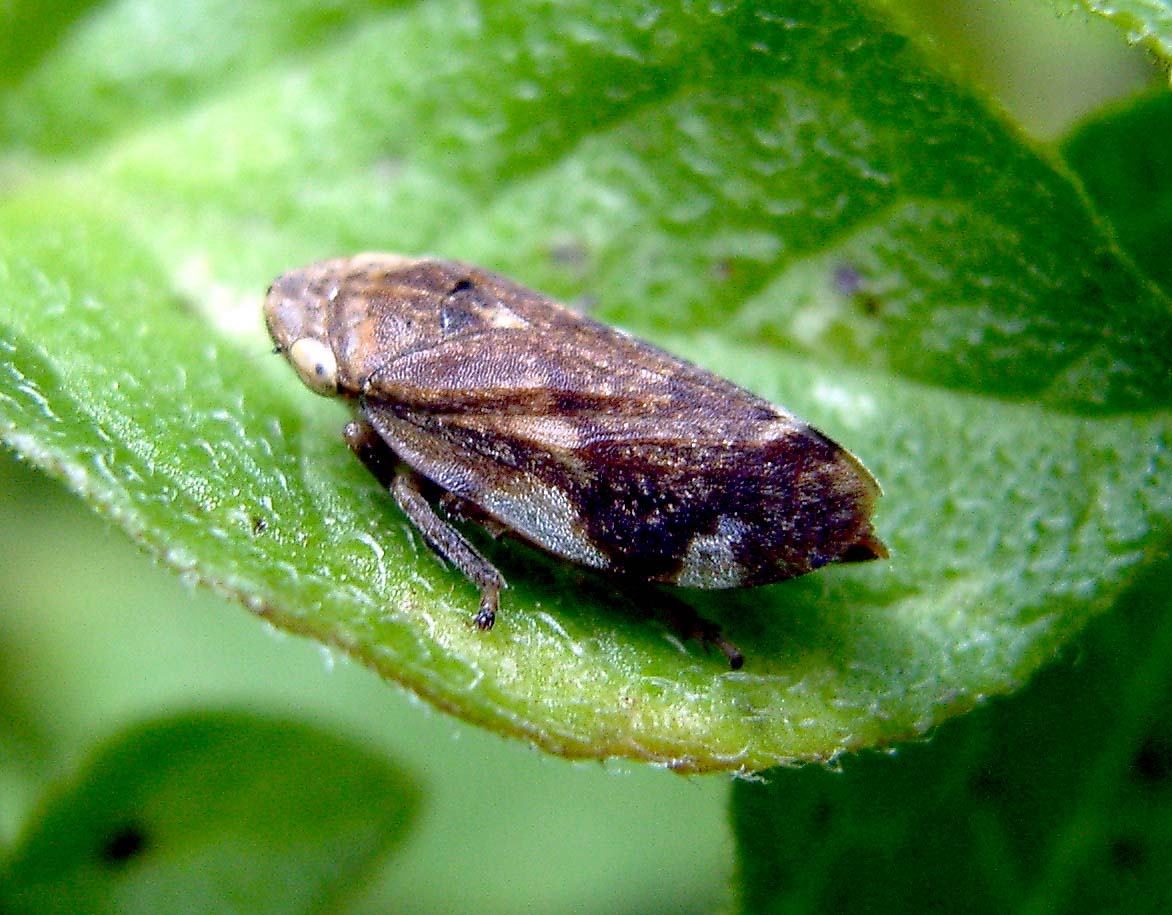
Adult

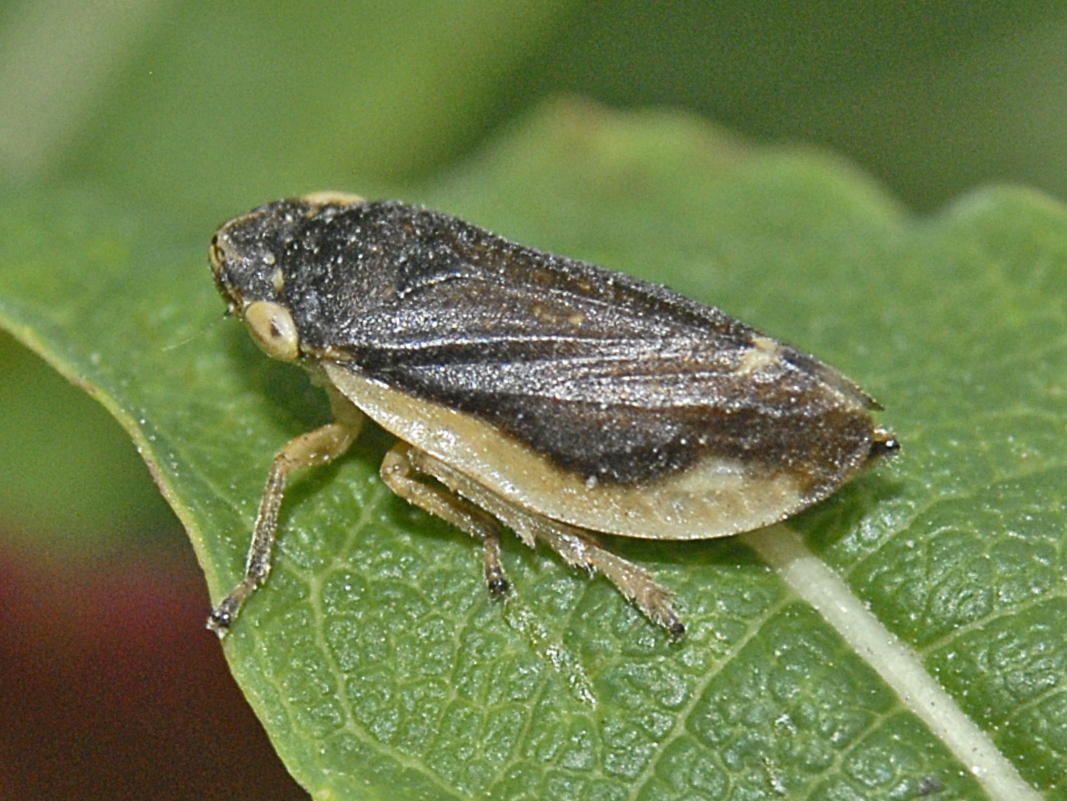
A different colour form
