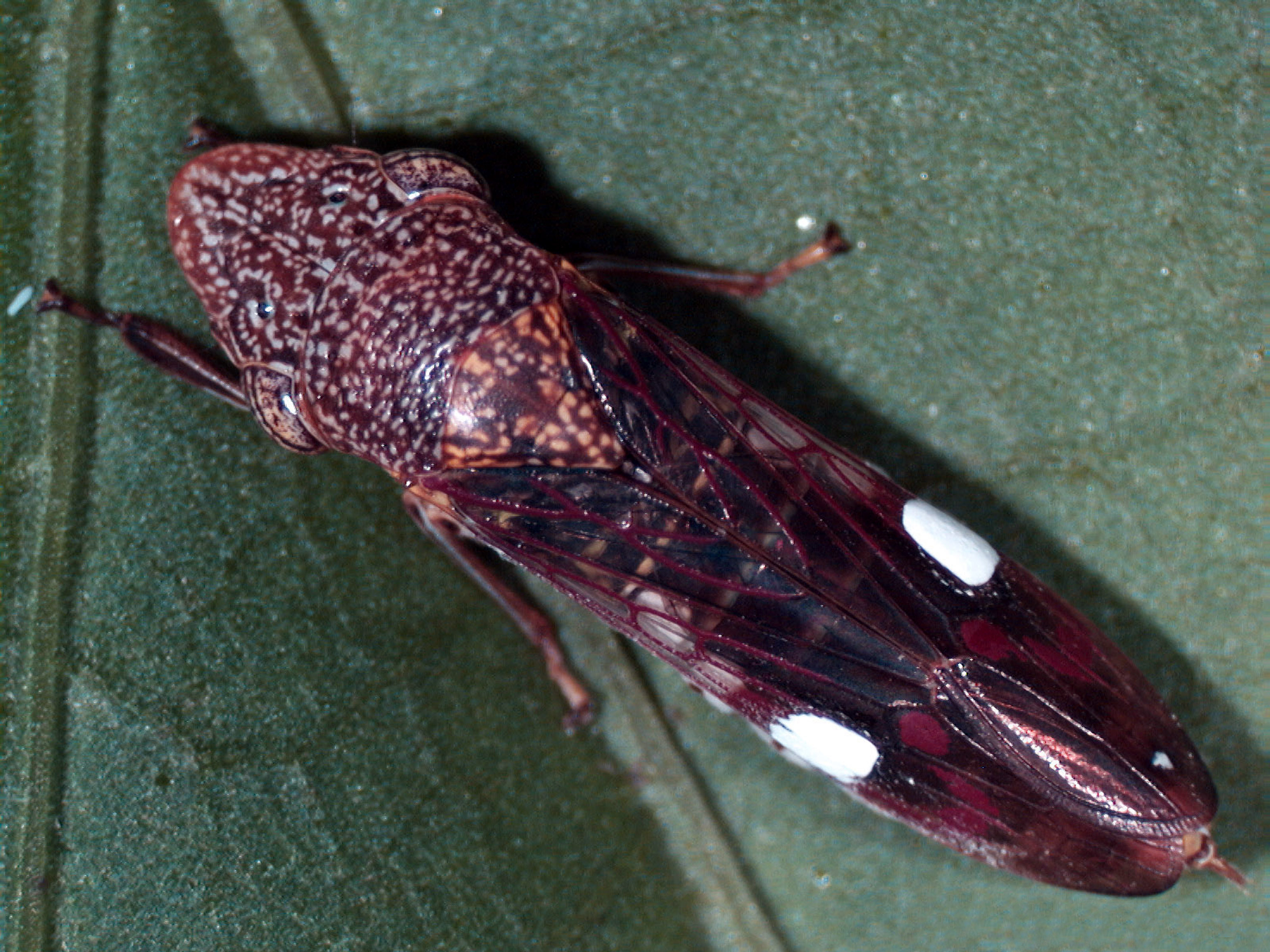

Scientific classification
- Kingdom: Animalia
- Phylum: Arthropoda
- Clade: Pancrustacea
- Class: Insecta
- Order: Hemiptera
- Suborder: Auchenorrhyncha
- Family: Cicadellidae
- Subfamily: Cicadellinae
- Tribe: Proconiini
- Genus: Homalodisca
- Species: H. vitripennis

Binomial name
- Homalodisca vitripennis (Germar, 1821)

Synonyms
- Tettigonia vitripennis Germar, 1821; Tettigonia coagulata Say, 1832; Homalodisca coagulata (Say, 1832)

= Glassy-winged sharpshooter =

Species of leafhopper

The glassy-winged sharpshooter (Homalodisca vitripennis, formerly known as H. coagulata) is a large leafhopper (family Cicadellidae), similar to other species of sharpshooter. It is native to southeastern United States. It is of economic concern in California because it can spread the plant-pathogenic bacterium Xylella fastidiosa.

== Description ==
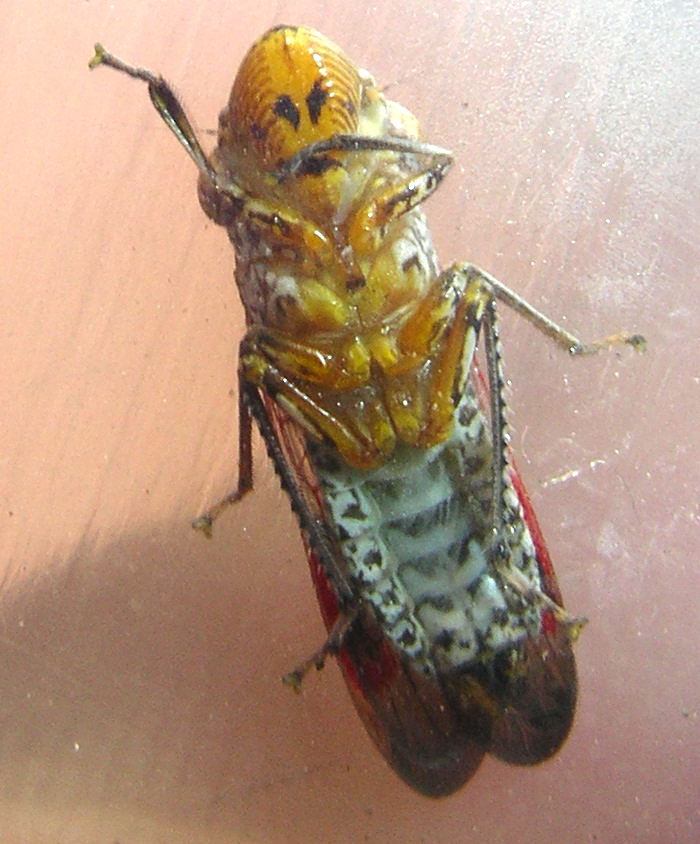
Glassy-winged sharpshooter underside

These sharpshooters are about 12 millimetres (0.5 in) in length. Their color is dark brown to black with black-and-yellow undersides, with yellow eyes, and the upper parts of the head and back are speckled with ivory or yellowish spots. The wings are transparent with reddish veins.

They have piercing, sucking mouthparts and rows of fine spines on their hind legs.

They eject up to 300 times their body weight in liquid waste each day thanks to an energy-saving technique known as superpropulsion, where an oscillating surface ejects a liquid droplet at a speed higher than the surface itself.

=== Life history ===
Glassy-winged sharpshooters usually lay a mass of eggs on the underside of leaves, and they cover them with powdery white protective secretions kept in dry form (called "brochosomes") on the wings. After the nymphs hatch, the remaining egg mass leaves a brown mark on the leaf's surface. The nymphs feed within the vascular system of the small stems on the plant where the eggs were deposited. After several molts, the nymphs become adult glassy-winged sharpshooters.

=== Ecology ===
The glassy-winged sharpshooter feeds on a wide variety of plants. Scientists estimate the host plants for this sharpshooter include over 70 different plant species. Among the hosts are grapes, citrus trees, almonds, stone fruit, and oleanders. Because of the large number of hosts, glassy-winged sharpshooter populations are able to flourish in both agricultural and urban areas. They feed on a plant by inserting their needle-like mouth parts into the plant's xylem. While feeding, sharpshooters squirt small droplets of waste from the anus (filtered xylem fluid, basically water with trace solutes, especially carbohydrates), often called "leafhopper rain." These droplets are messy and, when the water evaporates, leave a residue that gives plants and fruit a whitewashed appearance.

Their feeding method, along with their voracious appetite for so many different hosts, makes glassy-winged sharpshooters an effective vector for the Xylella fastidiosa bacterium. Once the sharpshooter feeds on an infected plant, X. fastidiosa colonizes it by forming a biofilm on its mouth-parts. The sharpshooter then transmits the disease to additional plants while feeding. A plant that is not affected by any of the diseases caused by X. fastidiosa becomes a reservoir, holding the bacterium for other sharpshooters to pick up and carry to other plants. X. fastidiosa is linked to many plant diseases, including phoney peach disease in the southern United States, oleander leaf scorch and Pierce's disease in California, and citrus X disease in Brazil.

== Distribution ==
It is native to North America (southeastern United States), but it was accidentally introduced into Southern California in the early 1990s, probably with ornamental or agricultural stock. There it has become an agricultural pest especially to viticulture.

Significant population growth did not occur after successful establishment in California until about 10 years later. Extraordinary population growth coincided with the beginning of irrigation of desert habitats that were normally too dry to support H. vitripennis populations.

== Management ==
The principal reason for controlling the glassy-winged sharpshooter is to prevent the spread of X. fastidiosa to susceptible plants. Their feeding and excrement, known as "sharpshooter rain", rarely causes significant plant damage.

There are many beneficial arthropods (including assassin bugs, praying mantids, spiders, and lacewings) and parasitic wasps (primarily mymarid and trichogrammatid parasitoids) that can be used for control. Early in the year, parasitoid wasps provide only 10-50% parasitism, but by late summer/early fall they can cause upwards of 90% mortality.

In their native range of southeastern US, the most common natural predators associated with H. vitripennis eggs are species in the Mymaridae family, Gonatocerus ashmeadi, G. triguttatus, G. morrilli, and G. fasciatus. Many of these species have been introduced in California and some—like G. ashmeadi—likely self-introduced and feed on the closely related native smoke-tree sharpshooter.

Because biological control is the primary control strategy employed, it is important to avoid broad-spectrum insecticides that may kill parasitoids and beneficial arthropods.

One of the newly discovered pathogens is a virus specific to sharpshooters. The leafhopper-infecting virus, Homalodisca coagulata virus-1 (HoCV-1, Dicistroviridae), has been shown to increase leafhopper mortality. The virus occurs in nature and is spread most readily at high population densities through contact among infected individuals, contact with virus-contaminated surfaces, and/or as an aerosol in leafhopper excreta.
