= Electrodeposition =

Material processing technology

Electrodeposition (electrochemical deposition or electroplating) is a material processing technology. It uses electric current to cause a material (typically a metal) to deposit on an electrode. The electrode is immersed in an electrolyte containing ions of the material. Applied current causes the material to form a deposit.

Electrodeposition is for a variety of applications, most commonly to create coatings that improve corrosion resistance, wear resistance, conductivity, or appearance.

== History ==
Luigi Valentino Brugnatelli invented electrodeposition in 1805 using Alessandro Volta's voltaic pile to deposit gold. The French Academy of Sciences suppressed his work, delaying industrial use for decades. By the 1830s–1840s, scientists in Britain and Russia independently developed processes for copper plating printing plates. Commercial applications grew in the 1850s for nickel, brass, tin, and zinc.

The 20th century expanded uses to electronics, including flip-chip solder in the 1990s. Recent advances focus on nanostructures, alloys, and energy materials.

== Variations ==
=== Electroforming ===
Electroforming uses electrodeposition to create metal parts, typically by depositing relatively thick layers on a mandrel that is removed after forming. The mandrel features conductive areas (that accept deposition) and non-conductive areas (that do not).

=== Electroplating ===
In electroplating, a thin metal layer is deposited on an existing object and remains there. Electroplating is typically used to change the electrical or mechanical properties of an object surface.

== Process and mechanism ==
Electrodeposition occurs in an electrochemical cell with:

- Cathode (substrate)
- Anode (often the metal to deposit)
- Electrolyte (aqueous, ionic liquid, or organic)

Direct or pulsed current drives metal ions (M^{n+}) to reduce at the cathode: M^{n+} + n e^* → M. At the anode, oxidation replenishes ions or evolves oxygen.

Nucleation and growth follow progressive or instantaneous models, influenced by overpotential, current density, pH, temperature, and additives. Additives control brightness, leveling, or stress. Pulse plating improves uniformity and reduces hydrogen embrittlement.

== Applications ==
Industries widely use electrodeposition for:

- Decorative coatings (jewelry, automotive chrome)
- Corrosion protection (zinc on steel)
- Wear resistance (hard chromium)
- Electronics (copper interconnects, gold contacts)
- Water purification to remove metals
- Mineral extraction from seawater (uranium)

Emerging uses include:

- Nanostructured materials
- Catalysts for hydrogen evolution
- Battery electrodes
- Supercapacitors
- Biomedical implants
- Ceramics or polymers, such as automotive paints or bioceramics

=== Non-metals ===
Electrodeposition has been used to accelerate calcium carbonate deposition in marine environments to act as a substrate for artificial coral reefs.

== Advantages and disadvantages ==
Advantages include low cost, room-temperature operation, conformal coverage on complex shapes, precise thickness control, and scalability. It enables alloy and composite deposits. One study reported that electrodeposition processing capacity (29 g g−1) was two orders of magnitude higher than that of adsorption, including selectively depositing specific metals using alternating current (AC).

Disadvantages involve limited aqueous potential windows (causing hydrogen evolution), environmental concerns from toxic baths (e.g., cyanide, chromium(VI)), uneven thickness on irregular substrates, and slower rates compared to physical vapor deposition. Ionic liquids and pulse methods mitigate some issues.

== Research ==
Advances feature nanostructured deposits, high-entropy alloys, and self-supported electrodes for energy conversion (HER, OER, CO2 reduction). Researchers are exploring electrodeposition-redox replacement for trace metal recovery and 3D conformal coatings on porous substrates. Integration with additive manufacturing and AI-driven parameter optimization accelerates development.

== See also ==
- Electrophoretic deposition (EPD) for non-metallic particles
- Underpotential deposition for monolayers
- Electroforming
