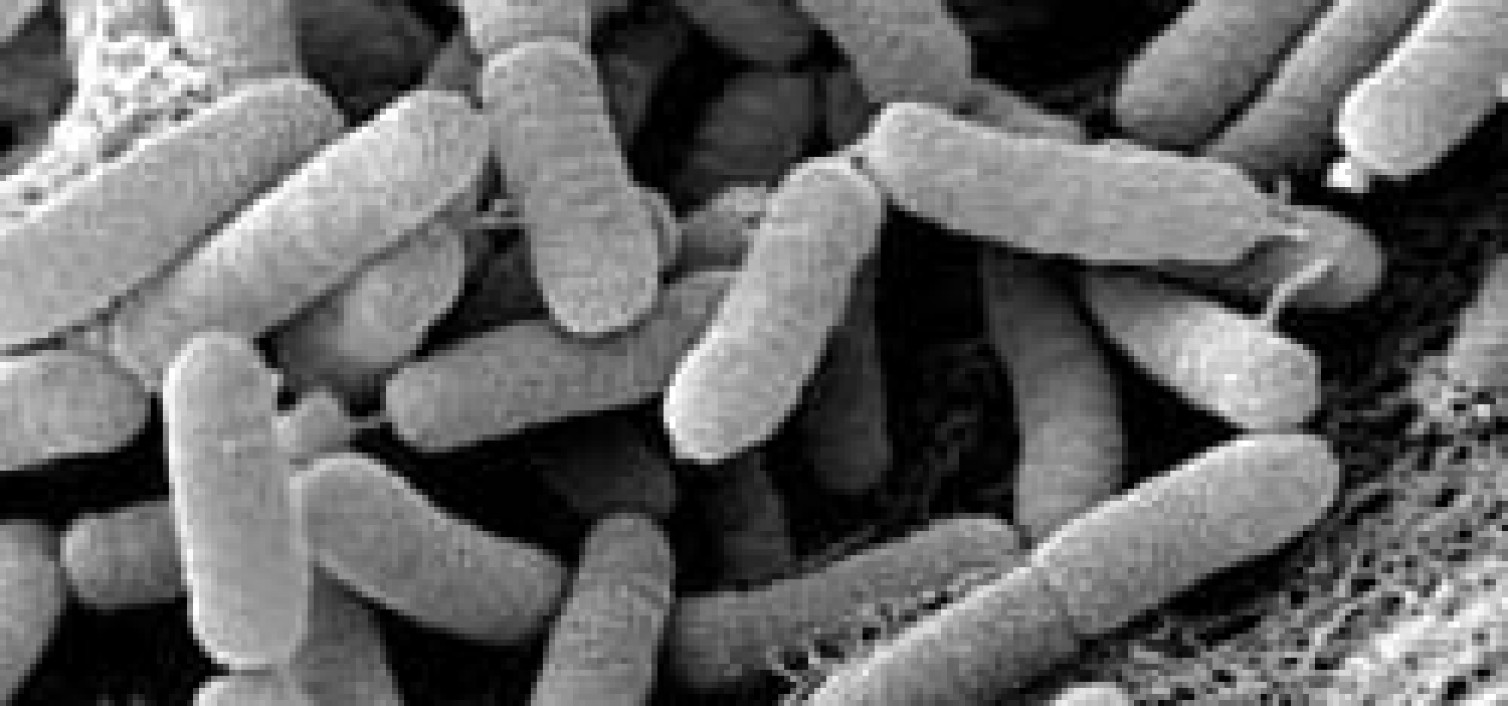

Scientific classification
- Domain: Bacteria
- Kingdom: Pseudomonadati
- Phylum: Pseudomonadota
- Class: Gammaproteobacteria
- Order: Lysobacterales
- Family: Lysobacteraceae
- Genus: Xylella
- Species: X. fastidiosa

Binomial name
- Xylella fastidiosa Wells et al., 1987

= Xylella fastidiosa =

Bacteria harming plants, including crops

Xylella fastidiosa is an aerobic, Gram-negative bacterium of the genus Xylella. It is a plant pathogen, that grows in the water transport tissues of plants (xylem vessels) and is transmitted exclusively by xylem sap-feeding insects such as sharpshooters and spittlebugs. Many plant diseases are due to infections of X. fastidiosa, including bacterial leaf scorch, oleander leaf scorch, coffee leaf scorch (CLS), alfalfa dwarf, phony peach disease, and the economically important Pierce's disease of grapes (PD), olive quick decline syndrome (OQDS), and citrus variegated chlorosis (CVC). While the largest outbreaks of X. fastidiosa–related diseases have occurred in the Americas and Europe, this pathogen has also been found in Taiwan, Israel, and a few other countries worldwide.

Xylella fastidiosa can infect an extremely wide range of plants, many of which do not show any symptoms of disease. Disease occurs in plant species that are susceptible due to blockage of water flow in the xylem vessels caused by several factors: bacterial obstruction, overreaction of the plant immune response (tylose formation), and formation of air embolisms. A strain of X. fastidiosa responsible for citrus variegated chlorosis was the first bacterial plant pathogen to have its genome sequenced, in part because of its importance in agriculture. Due to the significant impacts of this pathogen on agricultural crops around the world, there is substantial investment in scientific research related to X. fastidiosa and the diseases it causes.

== Taxonomy ==
Xylella fastidiosa is the first-proposed species in the genus Xylella and the only species until 2016. The genus Xyella Wells et al. 1987 currently consists of two species, Xylella fastidiosa Wells et al. 1987 and Xylella taiwanensis Su et al. 2016. Xylella fastidiosa in turn consists of several subspecies, each with own preferred host plants and geographic origin:

- X. f. subsp. fastidiosa (Wells et al. 1987) Schaad et al. 2009 is defined around the original type strain and is the best-studied so far. It is mainly known for Pierce's disease of grapevines and leaf scorch of almond. It also affects alfalfa and maple. It is thought to have originated in southern Central America.
  - Identical to invalid name "X. f. subsp. piercei" Schaad et al. 2004.
- X. f. subsp. multiplex Schaad et al. 2009 affects many trees, including stone-fruit ones such as peaches and plums, and is thought to originate in temperate and southern North America. It also affects elm, grape, and sycamore.
- "X. f. subsp. pauca" Schaad et al. 2004 is believed to have originated in South America. It is the causal agent of citrus variegated chlorosis (CVC) in Brazil. It also affects South American coffee crops, causing coffee leaf scorch.
- "X. f. subsp. sandyi" Schuenzel et al. 2005 is thought to have originated in the southern part of the United States, and is notable for causing oleander leaf scorch.
- "X. f. subsp. tashke" Randell et al., 2009 is proposed to include isolates associated with Chitalpa tashkentensis leaf scorch in Southwestern USA. Whether it is causative is unknown. Whether it forms a distinct group that can be called a subspecies is also unknown.
- "X. f. subsp. morus" Nunney et al. 2014 includes a strain associated with mulberry leaf scorch in the eastern USA and California. It is genetically distinct enough to be its own subspecies.

The three X. fastidiosa subspecies by Schaad et al. were outlined in the same 2004 publication. Two of them were made valid according to the Prokaryotic Code in 2009. No reason was given for not validating the third subspecies, pauca.

X. taiwanensis affects Pyrus pyrifolia in Taiwan, causing leaf scorch. It has not spread to the EU. It was originally proposed to be a subspecies of X. f., but the large divergence lead to the proposal of a separate species.

== Pathogen anatomy and disease cycle ==
Xylella fastidiosa is rod-shaped, and at least one subspecies has two types of pili on only one pole; longer, type IV pili are used for locomotion, while shorter, type I pili assist in biofilm formation inside their hosts. As demonstrated using a PD-related strain, the bacterium has a characteristic twitching motion that enables groups of bacteria to travel upstream against heavy flow, such as that found in xylem vessels. It is obligately insect-vector transmitted from xylem-feeding insects directly into xylem, but infected plant material for vegetative propagation (e.g. grafting) can produce mature plants that also have an X. fastidiosa disease. In the wild, infections tend to occur during warmer seasons, when insect vector populations peak. The bacterium is not seed transmitted, but instead is transmitted through "xylem feed-ing, suctorial homopteran insects such as sharpshooter leafhoppers and spittle bugs" and has been historically difficult to culture (fastidious), as its specific epithet, fastidiosa, reflects.

X. fastidiosa has a two-part lifecycle, which occurs inside an insect vector and inside a susceptible plant. While the bacterium has been found across the globe, only once the bacterium reaches systemic levels do symptoms present themselves. Once established in a new region, X. fastidiosa spread is dependent on the obligate transmission by xylem-sap feeding insect. Within susceptible plant hosts, X. fastidiosa forms a biofilm-like layer within xylem cells and tracheary elements that can completely block the water transport in affected vessels.

== Strains ==
EB92-1 is a significantly less pathogenic strain of X. fastidiosa which is used for biocontrol against its relatives. There is very little genomic distance between pathogenic and EB92-1 strains. However, 10 genes believed to be responsible for causing diseases in plants are missing. EB92-1 not only protects against X. fastidiosa infection; it also protects against Citrus Huanglongbing, which is caused by Liberibacter.

== Symptoms ==
Significant variation in symptoms is seen between diseases, though some symptoms are expressed across species. On a macroscopic scale, plants infected with a X. fastidiosa-related disease exhibit symptoms of water, zinc, and iron deficiencies, manifesting as leaf scorching and stunting in leaves turning them yellowish-brown, gummy substance around leaves, fruit reduction in size and quality, and overall plant height. As the bacterium progressively colonizes xylem tissues, affected plants often block off their xylem tissue, which can limit the spread of this pathogen; blocking can occur in the form of polysaccharide-rich gels, tyloses, or both. These plant defenses do not seem to hinder the movement of X. fastidiosa. Occlusion of vascular tissue, while a normal plant response to infection, makes symptoms significantly worse; as the bacterium itself also reduces vascular function, a 90% reduction of vascular hydraulic function was seen in susceptible Vitis vinifera. This bacterium rarely completely blocks vascular tissue. There usually is a slight amount of vascular function that keeps the plant alive, but makes its fruit or branches die, making the specific plant economically nonproductive. This can cause a massive drop on supply of quality fruit. Smaller colonies usually occur throughout a high proportion of xylem vessels of a symptomatic plant.

X. fastidiosa is a Gram-negative, xylem-limited illness that is spread by insects. It can damage a variety of broadleaved tree species that are commonly grown in the United States. X. fastidiosa can be found in about 755 different plant species.

- Withering and desiccation of branches
- Leaf chlorosis
- Dwarfing or lack of growth of the plant
- Drooping appearance and shorter internodes
- Shriveled fruits on infected plants
- Premature fruit abscission
- gum-like substance on leaves
- hardening and size reduction of fruit

=== Pierce's disease ===
(X. f. subsp. fastidiosa) Severe PD symptoms include shriveled fruit, leaf scorching, and premature abscission of leaves, with bare petioles remaining on stems.

=== Citrus variegated chlorosis ===
(X. f. subsp. pauca) This disease is named after the characteristic spotty chlorosis on upper sides of citrus leaves. Fruits of infected plants are small and hard.

=== Leaf scorches ===
Some isolates cause almond leaf scorch; in California, that includes CFBP8071 (fastidiosa), M23 (fastidiosa), and M12 (multiplex).

(X. f. subsp. pauca) Coffee Leaf Scorch (CLS) is a disease caused by the causal agent Xylella fastidiosa that is economically significant in Brazil. Citrus variegated chlorosis (CVC), another significant disease in this region caused by a strain of X. fastidiosa has been shown to infect coffee plants with CLS. The disease has also been found in Costa Rica's Central Valley where it is referred to as 'crespera' disease by coffee growers. Symptoms of the bacterial infection in coffee plants feature curling leaf margins, chlorosis and irregularly shaped leaves, stunting and reduced plant growth, and branch atrophy. The disease reduced coffee production by up to 30% in plantations across Brazil.

X. fastidiosa was discovered in Apulia, Italy in 2013 for the first time as a destructive disease agent of olive trees and likely came from strains present in asymptomatic plant material imported from Costa Rica. The strains were of a single origin in subspecies pauca.

== Environment ==
X. fastidiosa occurs worldwide, though its diseases are most prominent in riparian habitats including the southeastern United States, California, and South America.

Symptoms of X. fastidiosa diseases worsen during hot, dry periods in the summer; lack of water and maximum demand from a full canopy of leaves, combined with symptoms due to disease, stress infected plants to a breaking point. Cold winters can limit the spread of the disease, as it occurs in California, but not in regions with milder winters such as Brazil. Additionally, dry summers seem to delay symptom development of PD in California.

Any conditions that increase vector populations can increase disease incidence, such as seasonal rainfall and forests or tree cover adjacent to crops, which serve as alternate food sources and overwintering locations for leafhoppers.

Alexander Purcell, an expert on X. fastidiosa, hypothesized that plants foreign to X. fastidiosa's area of origin, the neotropical regions, are more susceptible to symptom development. Thus, plants from warmer climates are more resistant to X. fastidiosa disease development, while plants from areas with harsher winters, such as grapes, are more severely affected by this disease.

== Host species ==
X. fastidiosa has a very wide host range; as of 2020, its known host range was 595 plant species, with 343 species confirmed by two different detection methods, in 85 botanical families. Most X. fastidiosa host plants are dicots, but it has also been reported in monocots and ginkgo, a gymnosperm. However, the vast majority of host plants remain asymptomatic, making them reservoirs for infection.

Due to the temperate climates of South America and the southeastern and west coast of the United States, X. fastidiosa can be a limiting factor in fruit crop production, particularly for stone fruits in northern Florida and grapes in California. In South America, X. fastidiosa can cause significant losses in the citrus and coffee industries; a third of today's citrus crops in Brazil has CVC symptoms.

X. fastidiosa also colonizes the foreguts of insect vectors, which can be any xylem-feeding insects, often sharpshooters in the Cicadellidae subfamily Cicadellinae. After an insect acquires X. fastidiosa, it has a short latent period around 2 hours, then the bacterium is transmissible for a period of a few months or as long as the insect is alive. The bacterium multiplies within its vectors, forming a "bacterial carpet" within the foregut of its host. If the host sheds its foregut during molting, the vector is no longer infected, but can reacquire the pathogen. At present, no evidence shows that the bacterium has any detrimental effect on its insect hosts.

The EFSA maintains a list of plants known to be susceptible to Xylella and updates it regularly. Classification is performed down to the subspecies level if possible. As of May 2025, the latest report is from July 2024, containing information from literature published before 31 December 2023. The lists provided in EFSA's journal article about the update is only a summary; full data is available from the Microstrategy platform of the EFSA.

List of subspecies X. f. subsp. fastidiosa-susceptible plants (recreated from EFSA Panel of 2020)
Family	Genus
Amaranthaceae	Alternanthera, Chenopodium
Anacardiaceae	Rhus, Toxicodendron
Apiaceae	Conium, Datura, Daucus, Oenanthe
Apocynaceae	Nerium, Vinca
Araliaceae	Hedera
Asteraceae	Ambrosia, Artemisia, Baccharis, Callistephus, Conyza, Franseria, Helianthus, Lactuca, Solidago, Sonchus, Xanthium
Betulaceae	Alnus
Boraginaceae	Amsinckia
Brassicaceae	Brassica
Cannaceae	Canna
Caprifoliaceae	Lonicera, Symphoricarpos
Convolvulaceae	Convolvulus, Ipomoea
Cyperaceae	Cyperus
Fabaceae	Acacia, Chamaecrista, Cytisus, Genista, Lathyrus, Lupinus, Medicago, Melilotus, Spartium, Trifolium, Vicia
Fagaceae	Quercus
Geraniaceae	Erodium, Pelargonium
Juglandaceae	Juglans
Lamiaceae	Callicarpa, Origanum, Melissa, Mentha, Rosmarinus, Salvia
Lauraceae	Persea, Umbellularia
Magnoliaceae	Magnolia
Malvaceae	Malva
Myrtaceae	Eucalyptus, Eugenia, Metrosideros
Oleaceae	Fraxinus, Syringa
Onagraceae	Epilobium, Fuchsia, Clarkia, Oenothera
Pittosporaceae	Pittosporum
Platanaceae	Platanus
Poaceae	Avena, Bromus, Cynodon, Digitaria, Echinochloa, Eragrostis, Eriochola, Festuca, Holcus, Hordeum, Lolium, Paspalum, Pennisetum, Phalaris, Phleum, Poa, Setaria, Sorghum
Polygonaceae	Persicaria, Polygonum, Rheum, Rumex
Portulacaceae	Montia, Portulaca
Resedaceae	Reseda
Rhamnaceae	Rhamnus
Rosaceae	Cotoneaster, Fragaria, Photinia, Prunus, Rosa, Rubus
Rubiaceae	Coffea, Coprosma
Rutaceae	Citrus
Salicaceae	Populus, Salix
Sapindaceae	Acer, Aesculus
Scrophulariaceae	Veronica
Simmondsiaceae	Simmondsia
Solanaceae	Datura, Lycopersicon, Nicotiana, Solanum
Urticaceae	Urtica
Verbenaceae	Duranta
Viburnaceae	Sambucus
Vitaceae	Ampelopsis, Parthenocissus, Vitis

=== Oleander ===
Oleander leaf scorch is a disease of landscape oleanders (Nerium oleander) caused by a X. fastidiosa strain that has become prevalent in California and Arizona, starting in the mid-1990s. This disease is transmitted by a type of leafhopper (insect) called the glassy-winged sharpshooter (Homalodisca coagulata). Oleander is commonly used in decorative landscaping in California, so the plants serve as widely distributed reservoirs for Xylella.

Both almond and oleander plants in the Italian region of Apulia have also tested positive for the pathogen.

=== Grape vines ===
Pierce's disease (PD) was discovered in 1892 by Newton B. Pierce (1856–1916; California's first professional plant pathologist) on grapes in California near Anaheim, where it was known as "Anaheim disease". The disease is endemic in Northern California, being spread by the blue-green sharpshooter, which attacks only grapevines adjacent to riparian habitats. It became a real threat to California's wine industry when the glassy-winged sharpshooter, native to the Southeast United States, was discovered in the Temecula Valley in California in 1996; it spreads PD much more extensively than other vectors.

==== Symptoms of infection on grape vines ====
When a grape vine becomes infected, the bacterium causes a gel to form in the xylem tissue of the vine, preventing water from being drawn through the vine. Leaves on vines with Pierce's disease turn yellow and brown, and eventually drop off the vine. Shoots also die. After one to five years, the vine itself dies. The proximity of vineyards to citrus groves compounds the threat, because citrus is not only a host of sharpshooter eggs, but also is a popular overwintering site for this insect.

==== Collaborative efforts for solutions ====
In a unique effort, growers, administrators, policy makers, and researchers are working on a solution for this immense X. fastidiosa threat. No cure has been found, but the understanding of X. fastidiosa and glassy-winged sharpshooter biology has markedly increased since 2000, when the California Department of Food and Agriculture, in collaboration with different universities, such as University of California, Davis; University of California, Berkeley; University of California, Riverside, and University of Houston–Downtown started to focus their research on this pest. The research explores the different aspects of the disease propagation from the vector to the host plant and within the host plant, to the impact of the disease on California's economy. All researchers working on Pierce's disease meet annually in San Diego in mid-December to discuss the progress in their field. All proceedings from this symposium can be found on the Pierce's disease website, developed and managed by the Public Intellectual Property Resource for Agriculture (PIPRA).

Few resistant Vitis vinifera varieties are known, and Chardonnay and Pinot noir are especially susceptible, but muscadine grapes (V. rotundifolia) have a natural resistance. Pierce's disease is found in the Southeastern United States and Mexico. Also, it was reported by Luis G. Jiménez-Arias in Costa Rica, and Venezuela, and possibly in other parts of Central and South America. In 2010, X. fastidiosa became apparent in Europe, posing a serious, real threat. There are isolated hot spots of the disease near creeks in Napa and Sonoma in Northern California. Work is underway at UC Davis to breed PD resistance from V. rotundifolia into V. vinifera. The first generation was 50% high-quality V. vinifera genes, the next 75%, the third 87% and the fourth 94%. In the spring of 2007, seedlings that are 94% V. vinifera were planted.

A resistant variety, 'Victoria Red', was released for use especially in Coastal Texas.

The management of X. fastidiosa, a hostile plant pathogen, requires a multidisciplinary approach that includes genetic and spatial ecology perspectives. Such an approach will improve knowledge on invasive processes and resource allocation, optimizing diagnostic and management efforts. Effective communication with stakeholders is crucial for successful and sustainable management. X. fastidiosa is a useful way to study how pathogenicity changes at different levels of biological complexity. This will help scientists come up with better ways to find and control invasive species.

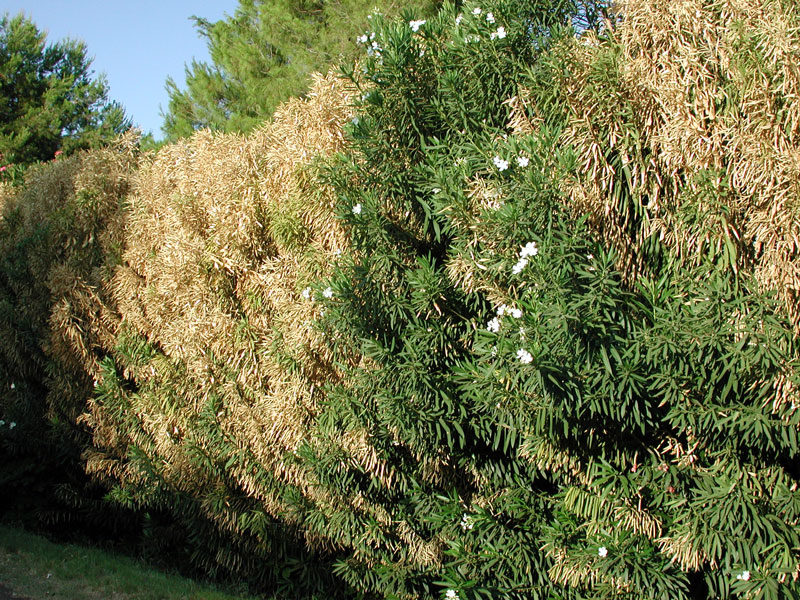
Nerium oleander infected with X. fastidiosa in Phoenix, Arizona

=== Olive trees ===
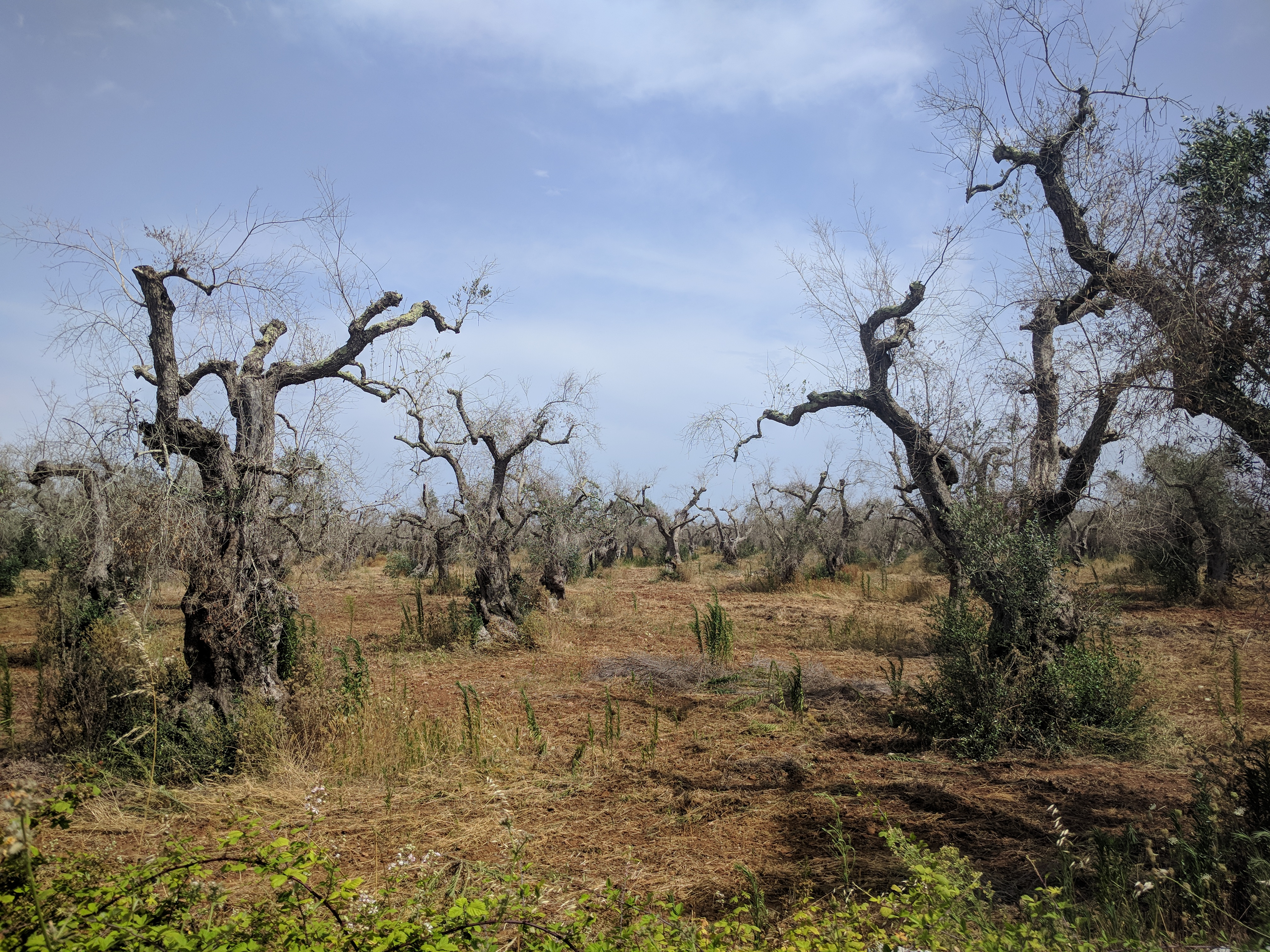
An olive grove infested with X. fastidiosa in Puglia, Italy in 2019

In October 2013, the bacterium was found infecting olive trees in the region of Apulia in southern Italy. The disease caused rapid decline in olive grove yields, and by April 2015, was affecting the whole Province of Lecce and other zones of Apulia, though it had not previously been confirmed in Europe. The subspecies involved in Italy is X. f. subsp. pauca, which shows a marked preference for olive trees and warm conditions and is thought to be unlikely to spread to Northern Europe.

The cycle in olives has been called olive quick decline syndrome (in Italian: complesso del disseccamento rapido dell'olivo). The disease causes withering and desiccation of terminal shoots, distributed randomly at first but then expanding to the rest of the canopy resulting in the collapse and death of trees. In affected groves, all plants normally show symptoms. The most severely affected olives are the century-old trees of local cultivars Cellina di Nardò and Ogliarola salentina.

By 2015, the disease had infected up to a million olive trees in Apulia and Xylella fastidiosa had reached Corsica, By October 2015, it had reached Mainland France, near Nice, in Provence-Alpes-Côte d'Azur, affecting the non-native myrtle-leaf milkwort (Polygala myrtifolia). This is the subspecies X. fastidiosa subsp. multiplex which is considered to be a different genetic variant of the bacterium to that found in Italy. On 18 August 2016 in Corsica, 279 foci of the infection have been detected, concentrated mostly in the south and the west of the island. In August 2016, the bacterium was detected in Germany in an oleander plant. In January 2017 it was detected in Mallorca and Ibiza.

Notably, in 2016, olive leaf scorch was first detected in X. fastidiosa's native range, in Brazil.

In June 2017, it was detected in the Iberian peninsula, specifically in Guadalest, Alicante. In 2018, it was detected elsewhere in Spain and Portugal, and in Israel in 2019.

=== Citrus ===
Xylella infection was detected in South American citrus in the 1980s and subsequently in the USA but had limited spread beyond the Americas until the detection in citrus groves in Portugal in 2023.

== Genome sequencing ==
The genome of X. fastidiosa was sequenced in 2000 by a pool of over 30 research laboratories in the state of São Paulo, Brazil, funded by the São Paulo Research Foundation.

== See also ==
- Bacterial leaf scorch
- Homalodisca vitripennis
- Philaenus spumarius
