= Potato yellow dwarf virus =

Virus classification
- (unranked): Virus
- Realm: Riboviria
- Kingdom: Orthornavirae
- Phylum: Negarnaviricota
- Class: Monjiviricetes
- Order: Mononegavirales
- Family: Rhabdoviridae
- Genus: Alphanucleorhabdovirus
- Species: Alphanucleorhabdovirus tuberosum

Synonyms
- Potato yellow dwarf alphanucleorhabdovirus; Potato yellow dwarf virus

Species of virus

Potato yellow dwarf virus (PYDV) is a plant virus in the family Rhabdoviridae. This virus was previously known as Marmor vulgare originally described from New York state, with a New Jersey-specific strain called Marmor vastans. This virus is vectored by Agallian leafhoppers, with the New York strain vectored by Aceratagallia sanguinolenta, and the New Jersey strain vectored by Agallia constricta. This virus can infect plants such as Trifolium incarnatum, Nicotiana rustica, N. glutinosa, and Solanum tuberosum.
