= Ozias (disambiguation) =

Ozias commonly refers to Uzziah, the 10th king of the ancient Kingdom of Judah.

Ozias may also refer to:

== People ==
- Ozias Bowen (1805–1871), former Justice of the Ohio Supreme Court
- Ozias Bvute, Zimbabwe cricket administrator
- Ozias Goodwin, co-founder of Hartford, Connecticut
- Ozias M. Hatch (1814–1893), former Illinois Secretary of State
- Ozias Humphrey (1742–1810), English painter
- Ozias Leduc (1864–1955), Canadian painter
- Ozias Thurston Linley (1765–1831), British musician
- Ozias Johnson (1910–1980)

== Other uses ==
- Ozias pedester, the species in insect genus Ozias of the tribe Agalliini
- Ozias, Greece, a community in the Paxi island group
- Ozias Midwinter, a character in Armadale
- Ozias Midwinter, a pen-name of Lafcadio Hearn
