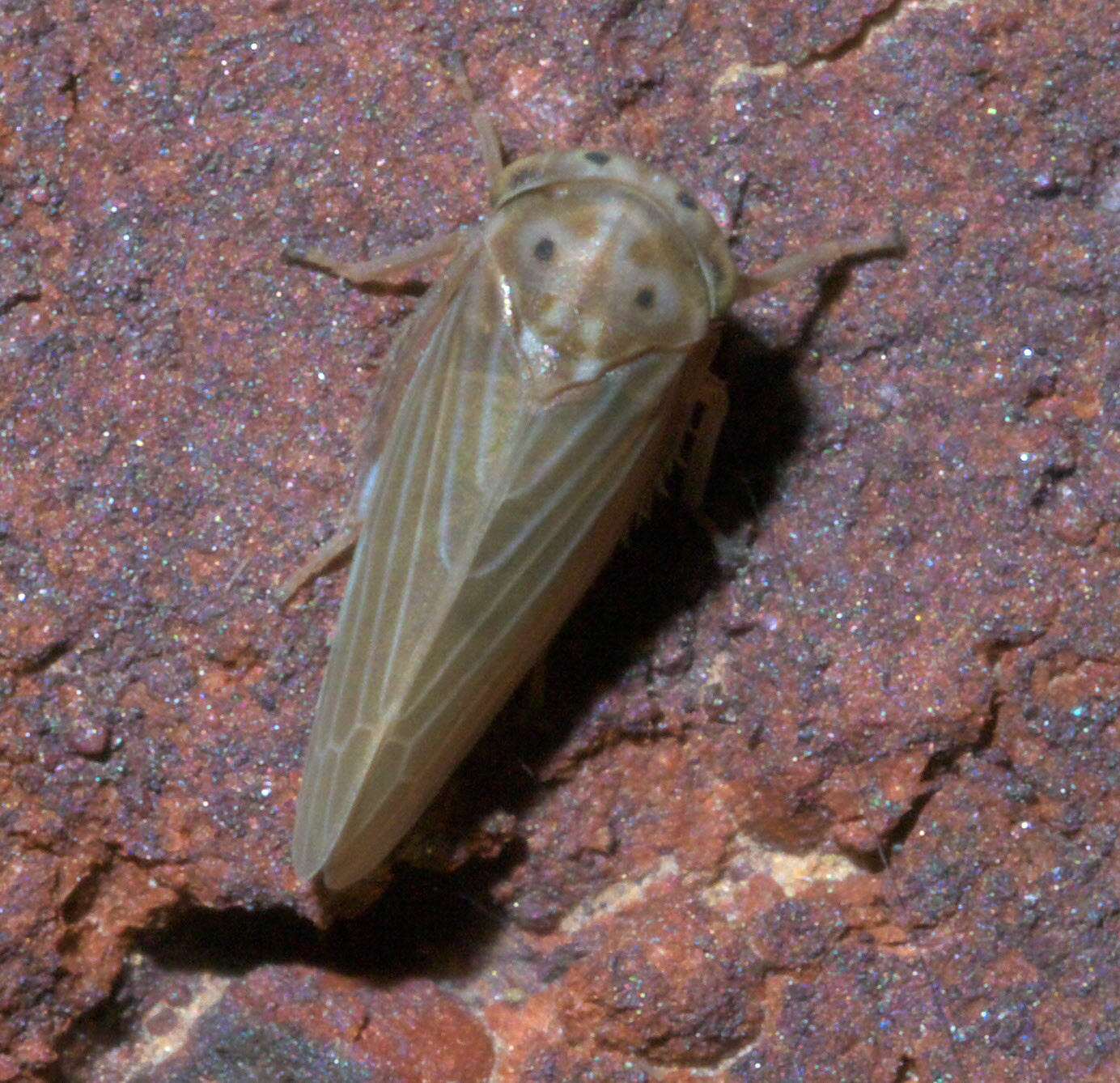
- Adult form

Scientific classification
- Kingdom: Animalia
- Phylum: Arthropoda
- Clade: Pancrustacea
- Class: Insecta
- Order: Hemiptera
- Suborder: Auchenorrhyncha
- Family: Cicadellidae
- Genus: Agallia
- Species: A. constricta

Binomial name
- Agallia constricta Van Duzee, 1894

= Agallia constricta =

Species of leafhopper

Agallia constricta, the constricted leafhopper, is a species of leafhopper found around North America. It is polyphagous, feeding on plants such as Trifolium incarnatum, Nicotiana rustica, N. glutinosa, and Solanum tuberosum and can vector to these plants a New Jersey-specific strain of potato yellow dwarf virus.
