= Zubara =

Scientific classification
- Kingdom: Animalia
- Phylum: Arthropoda
- Clade: Pancrustacea
- Class: Insecta
- Order: Hemiptera
- Suborder: Auchenorrhyncha
- Family: Cicadellidae
- Subfamily: Megophthalminae
- Tribe: Adelungiini
- Subtribe: Achrina
- Genus: Zubara; Al-Ne'amy & Linnavuori, 1982
- Species: Z. lycii

Binomial name
- Zubara lycii Al-Ne'amy & Linnavuori, 1982

Genus of insects

Zubara is a monotypic genus of leafhoppers in the subfamily Megophthalminae and tribe Adelungiini, containing the single species Zubara lycii, erected by Al-Ne'amy and Linnavuori in 1982.
