= Igerna bimaculicollis =

Scientific classification
- Kingdom: Animalia
- Phylum: Arthropoda
- Clade: Pancrustacea
- Class: Insecta
- Order: Hemiptera
- Suborder: Auchenorrhyncha
- Family: Cicadellidae
- Genus: Igerna
- Species: I. bimaculicollis

Binomial name
- Igerna bimaculicollis (Stål, 1855)

Synonyms
- Bythoscopus bimaculicollis Stål, 1855; Pachnys bimaculicollis (Stål, 1855); Agallia quadrinotata Melichar, 1903

Species of true bug

Igerna bimaculicollis is a species of leafhopper.
