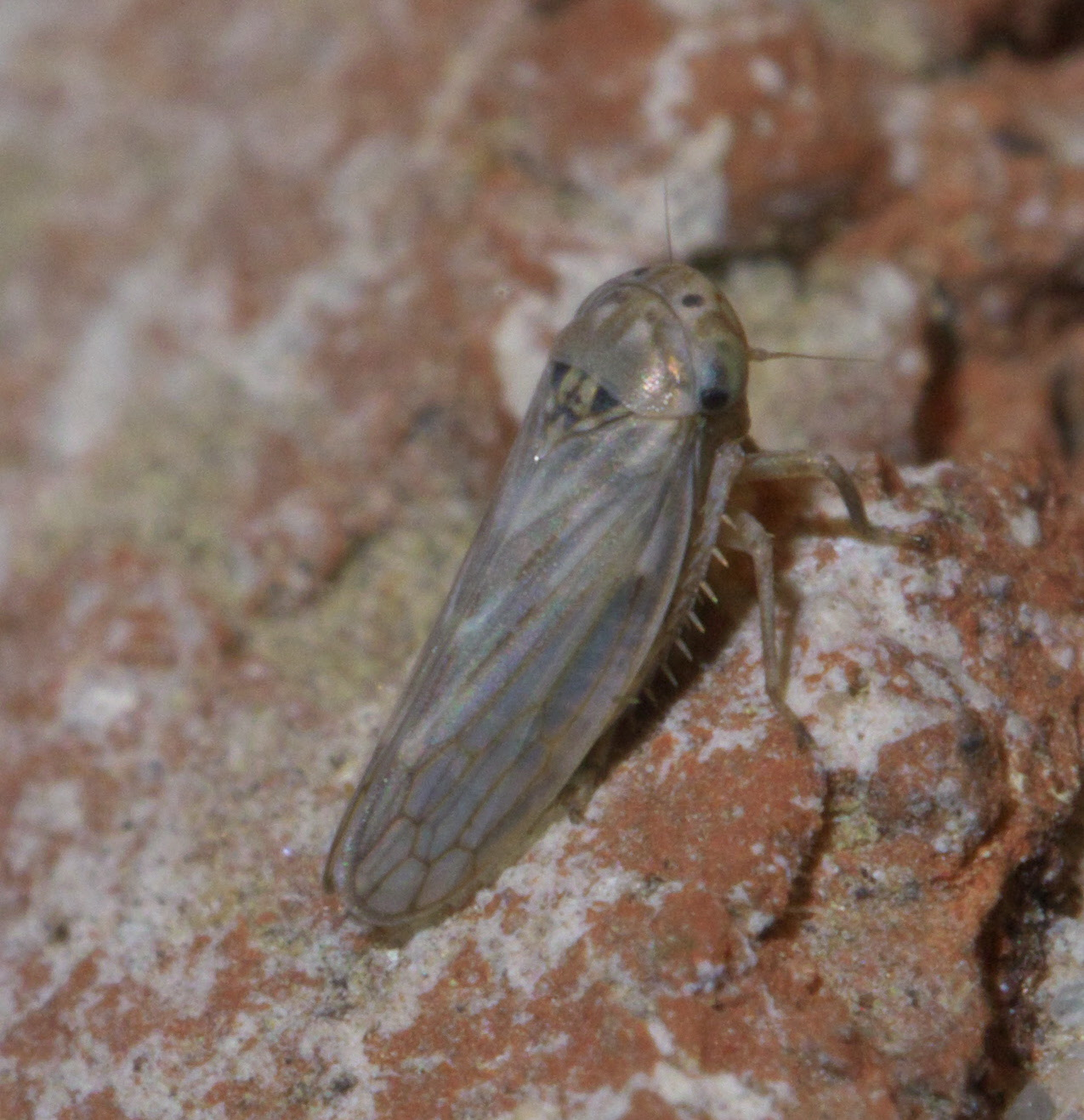

Scientific classification
- Kingdom: Animalia
- Phylum: Arthropoda
- Class: Insecta
- Order: Hemiptera
- Suborder: Auchenorrhyncha
- Family: Cicadellidae
- Tribe: Agalliini
- Subtribe: Agalliina
- Genus: Ceratagallia; Kirkaldy 1907

= Ceratagallia =

Genus of insects

Ceratagallia is a genus of leafhopper. Ceratagallia leafhoppers are found in semi-arid environments in North America, including California, Arizona, Nevada, Utah, Idaho, Colorado, New Mexico, Texas, Kansas, and Mexico.

== Description ==
Ceratagallia differ from other genera of leafhopper by their transversely striated pronotum and non-forked male genitalia.

== Taxonomy ==
Ceratagallia contains the following species:

- Ceratagallia californica
- Ceratagallia sanguinolentus
- Ceratagallia vulgaris
- Ceratagallia cinerea
- Ceratagallia semiarida
- Ceratagallia viator
- Ceratagallia coma
- Ceratagallia cristula
- Ceratagallia califa
- Ceratagallia cerea
- Ceratagallia okanagana
- Ceratagallia omani
- Ceratagallia siccifolia
- Ceratagallia calcaris
- Ceratagallia arida
- Ceratagallia tristis
- Ceratagallia vastitatis
- Ceratagallia ludora
- Ceratagallia canona
- Ceratagallia arroya
- Ceratagallia neodona
- Ceratagallia pera
- Ceratagallia dondia
- Ceratagallia lobata
- Ceratagallia nubila
- Ceratagallia pudica
- Ceratagallia grisea
- Ceratagallia artemisia
- Ceratagallia bigeloviae
- Ceratagallia brailovskyi
- Ceratagallia socala
- Ceratagallia ovata
- Ceratagallia loma
- Ceratagallia neovata
- Ceratagallia tergata
- Ceratagallia longipes
- Ceratagallia aplopappi
- Ceratagallia delta
- Ceratagallia nitidula
- Ceratagallia abrupta
- Ceratagallia nanella
- Ceratagallia robusta
- Ceratagallia loca
- Ceratagallia lupini
- Ceratagallia uhleri
- Ceratagallia siccifolius
- Ceratagallia curvata
- Ceratagallia longula
- Ceratagallia humilis
- Ceratagallia obscura
- Ceratagallia sanguinolenta
- Ceratagallia agricola
- Ceratagallia harrisi
