= Agallidwipa bispinosa =

Scientific classification
- Domain: Eukaryota
- Kingdom: Animalia
- Phylum: Arthropoda
- Class: Insecta
- Order: Hemiptera
- Suborder: Auchenorrhyncha
- Family: Cicadellidae
- Genus: Agallidwipa
- Species: A. bispinosa

Binomial name
- Agallidwipa bispinosa Viraktamath & Gonçalves, 2013

Species of true bug

Agallidwipa bispinosa is a species of leafhoppers from Madagascar.
