= Agallidwipa webbi =

Scientific classification
- Domain: Eukaryota
- Kingdom: Animalia
- Phylum: Arthropoda
- Class: Insecta
- Order: Hemiptera
- Suborder: Auchenorrhyncha
- Family: Cicadellidae
- Genus: Agallidwipa
- Species: A. webbi

Binomial name
- Agallidwipa webbi Viraktamath & Gonçalves, 2013

Species of true bug

Agallidwipa webbi is a species of leafhoppers from Madagascar.
