= Igerna (leafhopper) =

Scientific classification
- Domain: Eukaryota
- Kingdom: Animalia
- Phylum: Arthropoda
- Class: Insecta
- Order: Hemiptera
- Suborder: Auchenorrhyncha
- Family: Cicadellidae
- Subfamily: Megophthalminae
- Tribe: Agalliini
- Subtribe: Agalliina
- Genus: Igerna; Kirkaldy, 1903

Synonyms
- Pachynus Stål, 1866

Genus of leafhoppers

Igerna is a genus of leafhoppers in the family Cicadellidae. There are more than 20 described species in Igerna, found in Asia and Africa.

== Species ==
These 27 species belong to the genus Igerna:

- Igerna atrovenosa (Melichar, 1903) (Sri Lanka)
- Igerna aurora Viraktamath, 2011 (Brunei, Indonesia, Malaysia)
- Igerna bimaculicollis (Stål, 1855) (Africa)
- Igerna channa Viraktamath, Dai & Zhang, 2012
- Igerna darjeelingensis Viraktamath, 2011 (India)
- Igerna delineata Viraktamath, 2011 (India)
- Igerna delta Viraktamath & Gonçalves, 2013 (Madagascar)
- Igerna elegantula (Distant, 1917) (Seychelles)
- Igerna fasciata (Osborn, 1934) (Samoa)
- Igerna flavocosta Viraktamath & Gonçalves, 2013 (Madagascar)
- Igerna flavolineata (Distant, 1917) (Seychelles)
- Igerna himalayensis Viraktamath, 2011 (India)
- Igerna keyae Viraktamath, 2011 (India)
- Igerna kolasibensis Meshram, 2015
- Igerna malagasica Viraktamath & Gonçalves, 2013 (Madagascar)
- Igerna neosa (Webb, 1980) (Seychelles, Madagascar)
- Igerna nigrita (Melichar, 1914) (Java)
- Igerna nigrofusca (Melichar, 1905) (Tanzania, DR Congo)
- Igerna priyankae Viraktamath, 2011 (India, Nepal)
- Igerna quadrinotata (Melichar, 1903) (India, Sri Lanka)
- Igerna quadripunctula (Melichar, 1908) (Tanzania, DR Congo)
- Igerna quinlani Viraktamath, 2011 (Nepal)
- Igerna shillongensis Meshram, 2015
- Igerna sikkima Viraktamath, 2011 (India)
- Igerna tenuicaula Li, Dai & Li, 2012 (China)
- Igerna violacea (Distant, 1916) (India)
- Igerna wilsoni Viraktamath, 2011 (India)
