= Igerna delta =

Scientific classification
- Domain: Eukaryota
- Kingdom: Animalia
- Phylum: Arthropoda
- Class: Insecta
- Order: Hemiptera
- Suborder: Auchenorrhyncha
- Family: Cicadellidae
- Genus: Igerna
- Species: I. delta

Binomial name
- Igerna delta Viraktamath & Gonçalves, 2013

Species of true bug

Igerna delta is a species of leafhopper from Madagascar.
