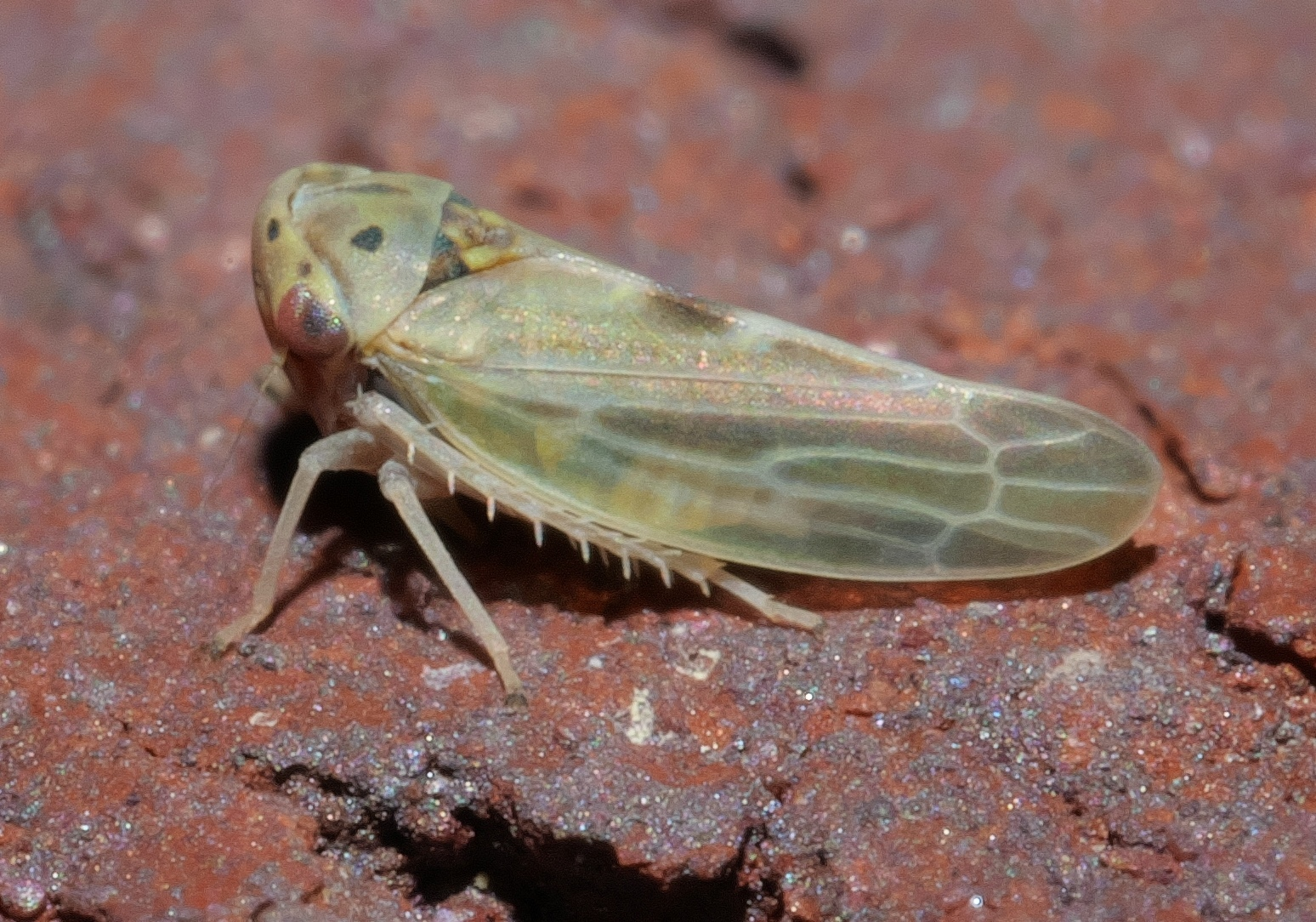
- Agalliopsis, Oklahoma

Scientific classification
- Domain: Eukaryota
- Kingdom: Animalia
- Phylum: Arthropoda
- Class: Insecta
- Order: Hemiptera
- Suborder: Auchenorrhyncha
- Family: Cicadellidae
- Subfamily: Megophthalminae
- Genus: Agalliopsis; Kirkaldy, 1907

Subgenera
- Agallaria; Agalliopsis

= Agalliopsis =

Genus of insects

Agalliopsis is a genus of typical leafhoppers in the subfamily Megophthalminae found in the Americas. There are more than 120 described species in Agalliopsis.

== Species ==
The following species belong to the genus Agalliopsis:

- Agalliopsis abietaria Oman, 1970
- Agalliopsis acrita Freytag, 2009
- Agalliopsis acuminata Oman, 1934
- Agalliopsis acuta Nielson & Godoy, 1995
- Agalliopsis acuticauda (Oman, 1933)
- Agalliopsis agrestis Oman, 1934
- Agalliopsis ancistra Oman, 1970
- Agalliopsis ancoralis Oman, 1933
- Agalliopsis ancyra Freytag, 2009
- Agalliopsis angularis Nielson & Godoy, 1995
- Agalliopsis anomala (Baker, 1898)
- Agalliopsis appendiculata Linnavuori & DeLong, 1979
- Agalliopsis atahualpa Linnavuori & DeLong, 1979
- Agalliopsis atricollis Linnavuori, 1956
- Agalliopsis balli (Baker, 1901)
- Agalliopsis basispina Nielson & Godoy, 1995
- Agalliopsis bicuspidata Linnavuori & DeLong, 1979
- Agalliopsis bidigita Freytag, 2009
- Agalliopsis bifida Linnavuori & DeLong, 1979
- Agalliopsis bilingua Nielson & Godoy, 1995
- Agalliopsis brunnea Oman, 1933
- Agalliopsis bulbata Nielson & Godoy, 1995
- Agalliopsis cervina Oman, 1933
- Agalliopsis chaelata Gonçalves, Mejdalani & Nova Coelho, 2009
- Agalliopsis cincta Oman, 1933
- Agalliopsis clavata Nielson & Godoy, 1995
- Agalliopsis clitellaria (Ball, 1900)
- Agalliopsis coluber Kramer, 1976
- Agalliopsis conformis Oman, 1933
- Agalliopsis cuculla Nielson & Godoy, 1995
- Agalliopsis curiche Linnavuori & DeLong, 1979
- Agalliopsis davidsoni Freytag, 2009
- Agalliopsis decis Cwikla & DeLong, 1985
- Agalliopsis dicroma Freytag, 2009
- Agalliopsis dirhachis Cwikla & DeLong, 1985
- Agalliopsis disparilis Oman, 1938
- Agalliopsis distincta Oman, 1934
- Agalliopsis dubiosa Oman, 1933
- Agalliopsis dutrai Gonçalves, Mejdalani & Nova Coelho, 2009
- Agalliopsis elegans Oman, 1938
- Agalliopsis emulata Oman, 1938
- Agalliopsis exilis Oman, 1933
- Agalliopsis extenda Freytag, 2009
- Agalliopsis extrema Freytag, 2009
- Agalliopsis falx Nielson & Godoy, 1995
- Agalliopsis felixi Gonçalves, Mejdalani & Nova Coelho, 2009
- Agalliopsis fissa Nielson & Godoy, 1995
- Agalliopsis fistulata Nielson & Godoy, 1995
- Agalliopsis flagellata Nielson & Godoy, 1995
- Agalliopsis florida Oman, 1935
- Agalliopsis furcata Nielson & Godoy, 1995
- Agalliopsis furtiva Nielson & Godoy, 1995
- Agalliopsis fuscosignata Oman, 1933
- Agalliopsis gavia Kramer, 1964
- Agalliopsis gracilis Oman, 1934
- Agalliopsis grandis Nielson & Godoy, 1995
- Agalliopsis hamata Nielson & Godoy, 1995
- Agalliopsis hamatilis Oman, 1970
- Agalliopsis harpago Linnavuori & DeLong, 1979
- Agalliopsis horrida Nielson & Godoy, 1995
- Agalliopsis huachucae Oman, 1933
- Agalliopsis hydra Kramer, 1964
- Agalliopsis iacula Nielson & Godoy, 1995
- Agalliopsis imitans Linnavuori & DeLong, 1979
- Agalliopsis imitator Linnavuori & DeLong, 1979
- Agalliopsis imparsumma Cwikla & DeLong, 1985
- Agalliopsis inscripta Oman, 1934
- Agalliopsis intera Freytag, 2009
- Agalliopsis lamboa Kramer, 1964
- Agalliopsis lamellaris Linnavuori & DeLong, 1979
- Agalliopsis lathripa Freytag, 2009
- Agalliopsis longipennis Oman, 1934
- Agalliopsis longistyla Freytag, 2009
- Agalliopsis maculata (Osborn, 1926)
- Agalliopsis magnifica Oman, 1933
- Agalliopsis majesta Oman, 1934
- Agalliopsis meiosa Freytag, 2009
- Agalliopsis minor Oman, 1933
- Agalliopsis minuta Nielson & Godoy, 1995
- Agalliopsis moesta Kramer, 1976
- Agalliopsis morai Nielson & Godoy, 1995
- Agalliopsis mutabilis Gonçalves, Mejdalani & Nova Coelho, 2009
- Agalliopsis neocervina Kramer, 1964
- Agalliopsis neopepino Oman, 1935
- Agalliopsis novella (Say, 1830)
- Agalliopsis novellina Oman, 1935
- Agalliopsis novoae Hidalgo-Gato González & Rodríguez-León Merino, 1999
- Agalliopsis oculata (Van Duzee, 1890)
- Agalliopsis ornata Oman, 1938
- Agalliopsis ornaticollis Oman, 1938
- Agalliopsis pallidipennis Linnavuori & DeLong, 1979
- Agalliopsis parkeri Nielson & Godoy, 1995
- Agalliopsis patula Nielson & Godoy, 1995
- Agalliopsis peneoculata Oman, 1933
- Agalliopsis pentaspinata Gonçalves, Mejdalani & Nova Coelho, 2009
- Agalliopsis pepino (DeLong & Wolcott, 1923)
- Agalliopsis peruviana Oman, 1938
- Agalliopsis pulchella Oman, 1938
- Agalliopsis puntana Linnavuori & DeLong, 1979
- Agalliopsis quadrifibra Nielson & Godoy, 1995
- Agalliopsis reflexa Oman, 1970
- Agalliopsis sagittata Nielson & Godoy, 1995
- Agalliopsis saxosa Ball, 1936
- Agalliopsis scortea (Van Duzee, 1907)
- Agalliopsis serpula Kramer, 1964
- Agalliopsis sexspinata Nielson & Godoy, 1995
- Agalliopsis similis Oman, 1934
- Agalliopsis sonorensis Oman, 1970
- Agalliopsis spinosa Linnavuori & DeLong, 1979
- Agalliopsis spira Nielson & Godoy, 1995
- Agalliopsis stella Oman, 1970
- Agalliopsis superba Linnavuori, 1956
- Agalliopsis talpa Kramer, 1976
- Agalliopsis tenella (Osborn & Ball, 1898)
- Agalliopsis texella Kramer, 1964
- Agalliopsis tincta Oman, 1938
- Agalliopsis treptona Freytag, 2009
- Agalliopsis trispinata Nielson & Godoy, 1995
- Agalliopsis tropicalis (Van Duzee, 1907)
- Agalliopsis uncula Freytag, 2009
- Agalliopsis variabilis Oman, 1933
- Agalliopsis variegata Gonçalves, Mejdalani & Nova Coelho, 2009
- Agalliopsis vellana Ball, 1936
- Agalliopsis vicosa Oman, 1938
- Agalliopsis virgator Linnavuori & DeLong, 1979
- Agalliopsis vittata Linnavuori & DeLong, 1979
- Agalliopsis vonella Oman, 1938
- Agalliopsis zenestra Kramer, 1964
- Agalliopsis zurquiensis Nielson & Godoy, 1995
