= Igerna neosa =

Scientific classification
- Domain: Eukaryota
- Kingdom: Animalia
- Phylum: Arthropoda
- Class: Insecta
- Order: Hemiptera
- Suborder: Auchenorrhyncha
- Family: Cicadellidae
- Genus: Igerna
- Species: I. neosa

Binomial name
- Igerna neosa (Webb, 1980)

Synonyms
- Stonasla neosa Webb, 1980

Species of true bug

Igerna neosa is a species of leafhopper from Madagascar.
