= Agallidwipa pauliana =

Scientific classification
- Domain: Eukaryota
- Kingdom: Animalia
- Phylum: Arthropoda
- Class: Insecta
- Order: Hemiptera
- Suborder: Auchenorrhyncha
- Family: Cicadellidae
- Genus: Agallidwipa
- Species: A. pauliana

Binomial name
- Agallidwipa pauliana (Evans, 1954)

Synonyms
- Agalliana pauliana Evans, 1954

Species of true bug

Agallidwipa pauliana is a species of leafhoppers from Madagascar.
