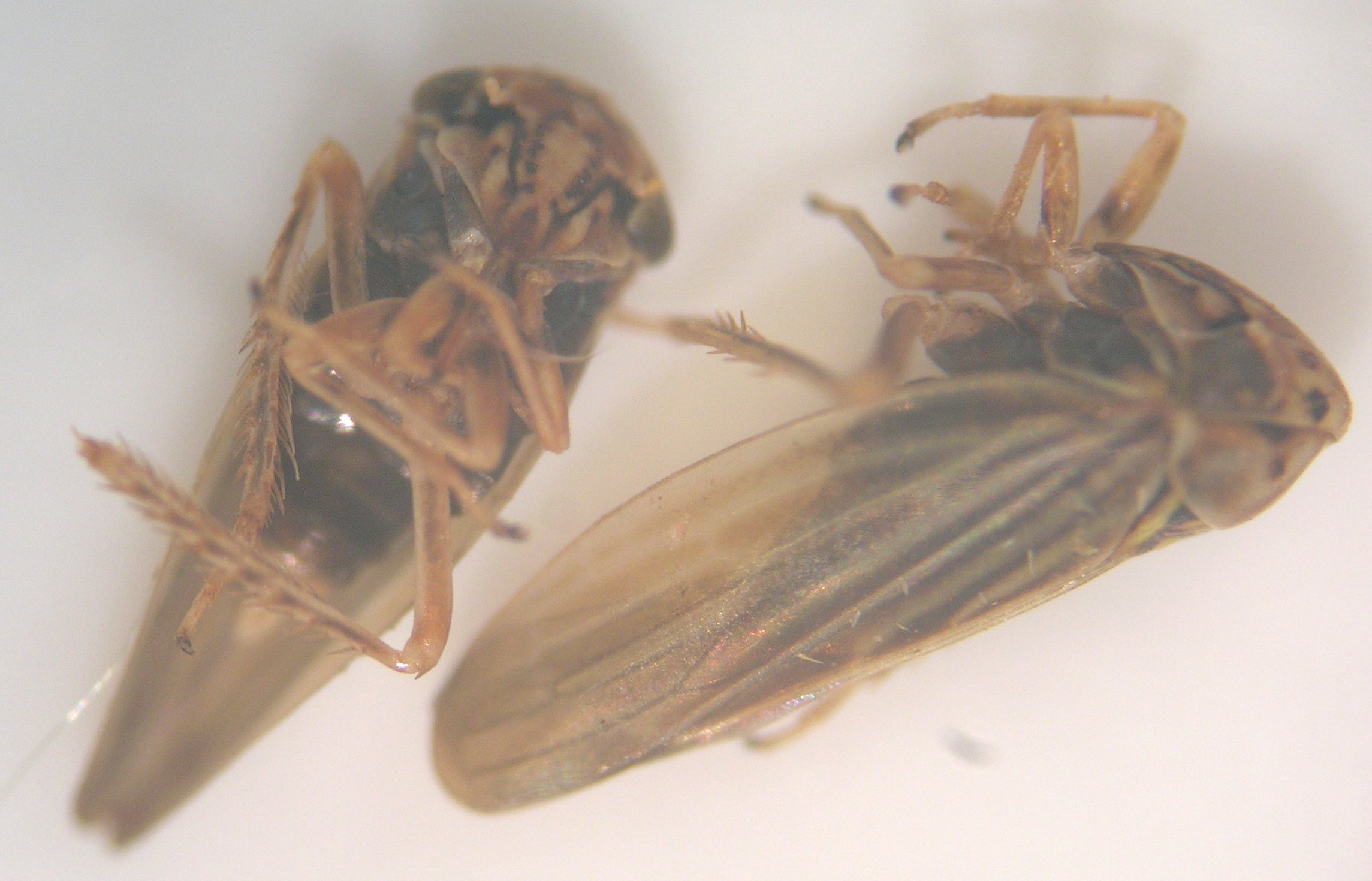

Scientific classification
- Domain: Eukaryota
- Kingdom: Animalia
- Phylum: Arthropoda
- Class: Insecta
- Order: Hemiptera
- Suborder: Auchenorrhyncha
- Family: Cicadellidae
- Genus: Agallia
- Species: A. lingula

Binomial name
- Agallia lingula Van Duzee, 1907

= Agallia lingula =

Species of true bug

Agallia lingula is a species of leafhopper in the family Cicadellidae.
