= Agallidwipa biramosa =

Scientific classification
- Domain: Eukaryota
- Kingdom: Animalia
- Phylum: Arthropoda
- Class: Insecta
- Order: Hemiptera
- Suborder: Auchenorrhyncha
- Family: Cicadellidae
- Genus: Agallidwipa
- Species: A. biramosa

Binomial name
- Agallidwipa biramosa Viraktamath & Gonçalves, 2013

Species of true bug

Agallidwipa biramosa is a species of leafhoppers from Madagascar.
