= Agallia brachyptera =

Scientific classification
- Domain: Eukaryota
- Kingdom: Animalia
- Phylum: Arthropoda
- Class: Insecta
- Order: Hemiptera
- Suborder: Auchenorrhyncha
- Family: Cicadellidae
- Genus: Agallia
- Species: A. brachyptera

Binomial name
- Agallia brachyptera (Boheman, 1847)

Species of true bug

Agallia brachyptera is a species of true bug belonging to the family Cicadellidae.

It is native to Europe.
