= Agallidwipa =

Scientific classification
- Kingdom: Animalia
- Phylum: Arthropoda
- Class: Insecta
- Order: Hemiptera
- Suborder: Auchenorrhyncha
- Family: Cicadellidae
- Subfamily: Megophthalminae
- Tribe: Agalliini
- Subtribe: Agalliina
- Genus: Agallidwipa; Viraktamath and Gonçalves, 2013

Genus of true bugs

Agallidwipa is a genus of leafhopper from Madagascar

== Species ==
- Agallidwipa biramosa Viraktamath & Gonçalves, 2013
- Agallidwipa bispinosa Viraktamath & Gonçalves, 2013
- Agallidwipa pauliana (Evans, 1954)
- Agallidwipa webbi Viraktamath & Gonçalves, 2013
