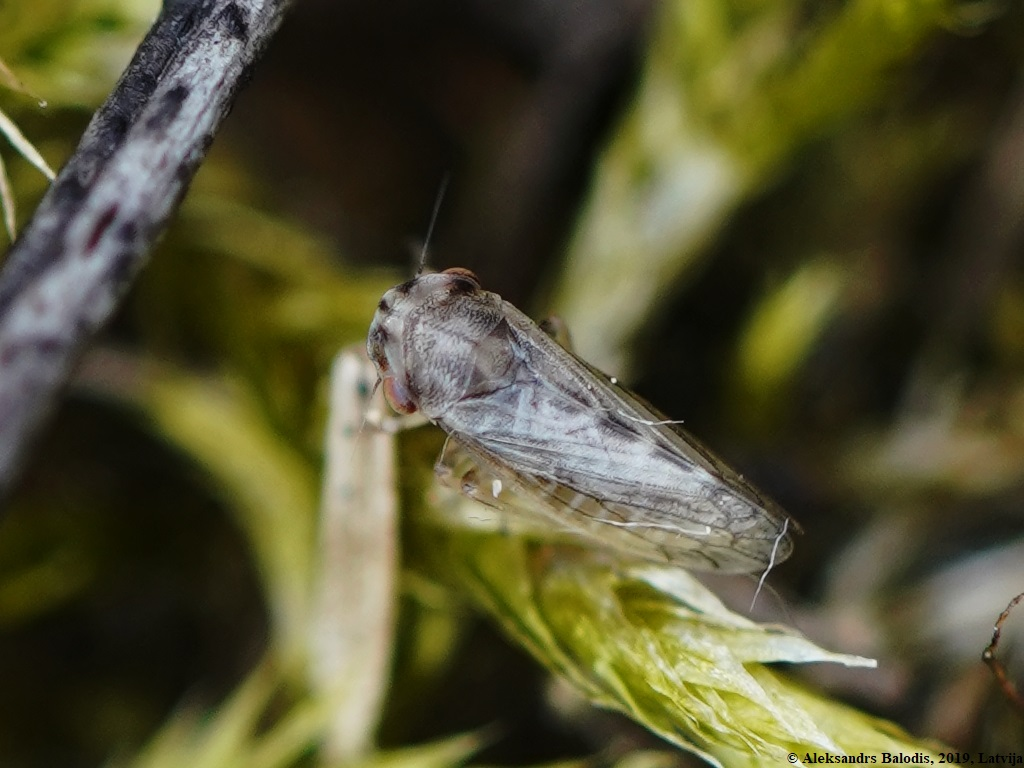
- Megophthalmus scanicus

Scientific classification
- Domain: Eukaryota
- Kingdom: Animalia
- Phylum: Arthropoda
- Class: Insecta
- Order: Hemiptera
- Suborder: Auchenorrhyncha
- Family: Cicadellidae
- Subfamily: Megophthalminae
- Tribe: Megophthalmini
- Genus: Megophthalmus; Curtis, 1833

Synonyms
- various orthographic variants including Megothalmus Curtis, 1833; Paropia Germar, 1833

= Megophthalmus =

Genus of true bugs

Megophthalmus is the type genus of leafhoppers for the subfamily Megophthalminae and tribe Megophthalmini; it was erected by John Curtis in 1833.

The species of this genus are found in Europe, including (both living species) in the British Isles.

== Species ==
The Global Biodiversity Information Facility includes:

- †Megophthalmus fortivenosus (Statz, 1950)
- Megophthalmus scabripennis Edwards, 1915
- Megophthalmus scanicus (Fallén, 1806)

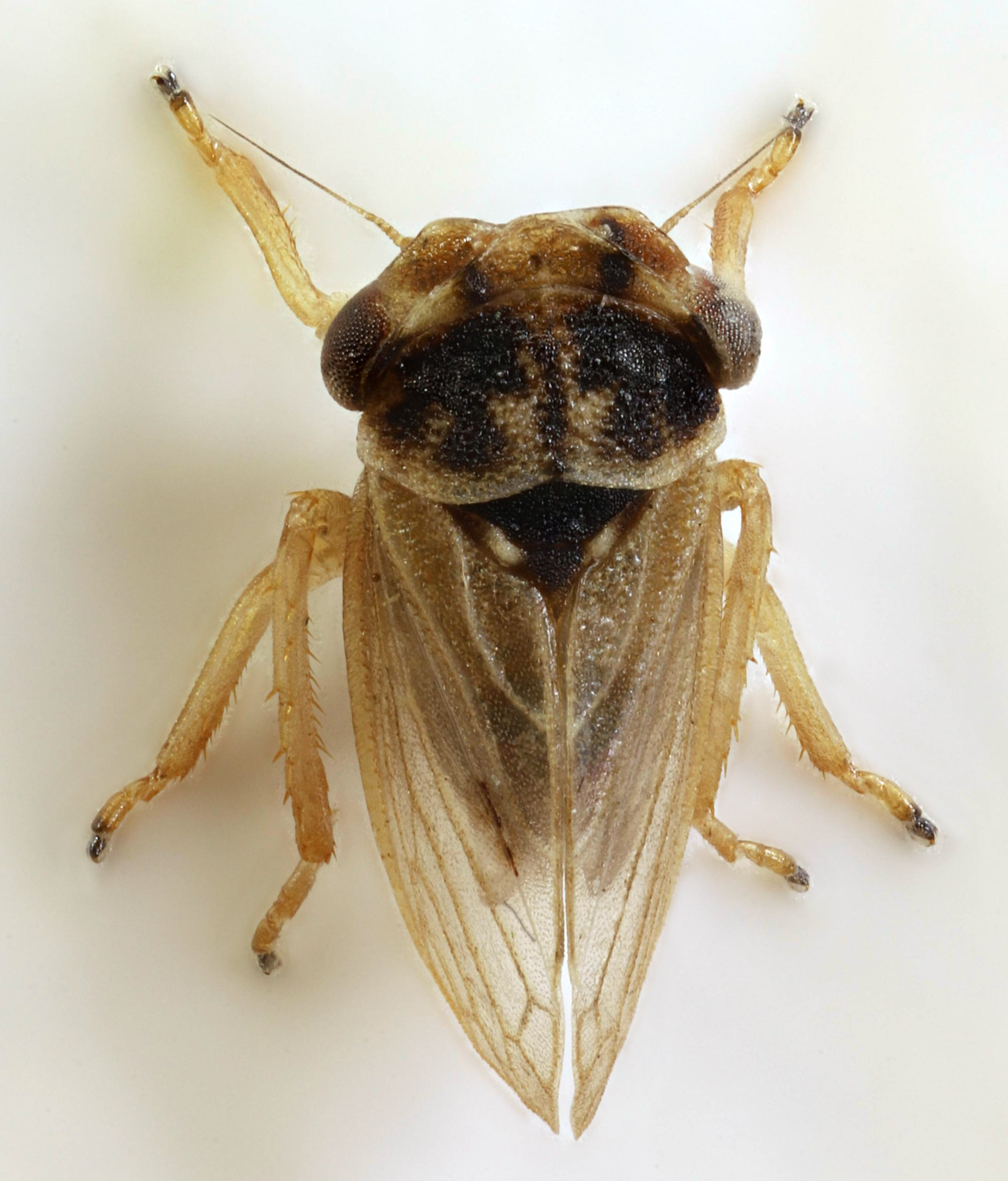
Megophthalmus scabripennis
