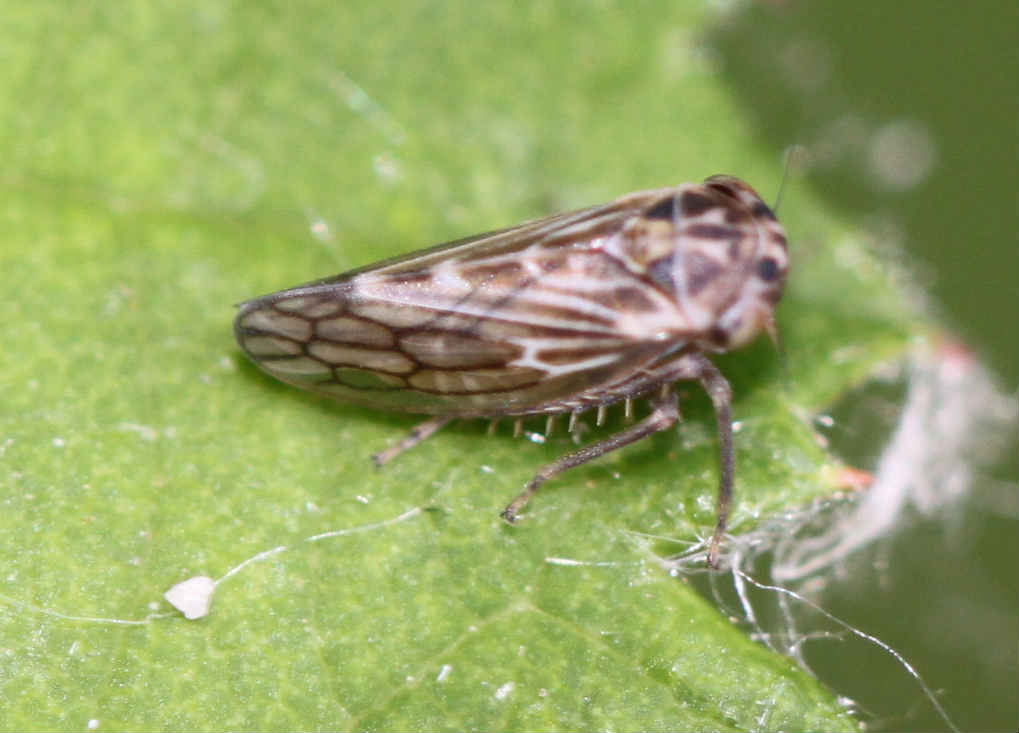
- Agallia consobrina

Scientific classification
- Kingdom: Animalia
- Phylum: Arthropoda
- Clade: Pancrustacea
- Class: Insecta
- Order: Hemiptera
- Suborder: Auchenorrhyncha
- Family: Cicadellidae
- Tribe: Agalliini
- Genus: Agallia; Curtis, 1833

= Agallia =

Genus of true bugs

Agallia is a genus of leafhoppers in the subfamily Megophthalminae erected by John Curtis in 1833. Species are mostly found in the western Palaearctic realm and the Americas.

There are about eight species in North America. During courtship displays and mating, both males and females of the species A. constricta alternate in making ticking sounds.

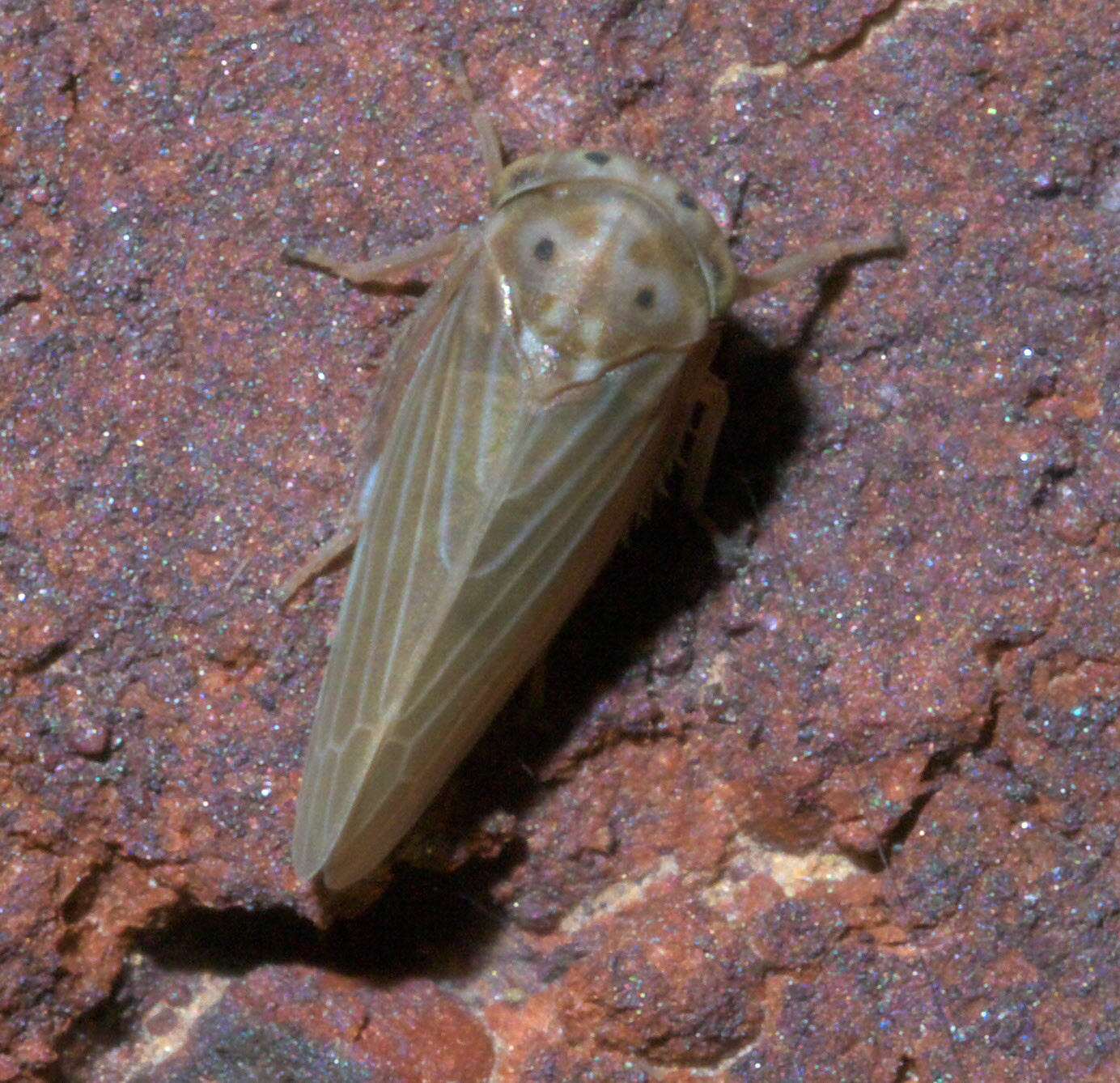
Agallia constricta

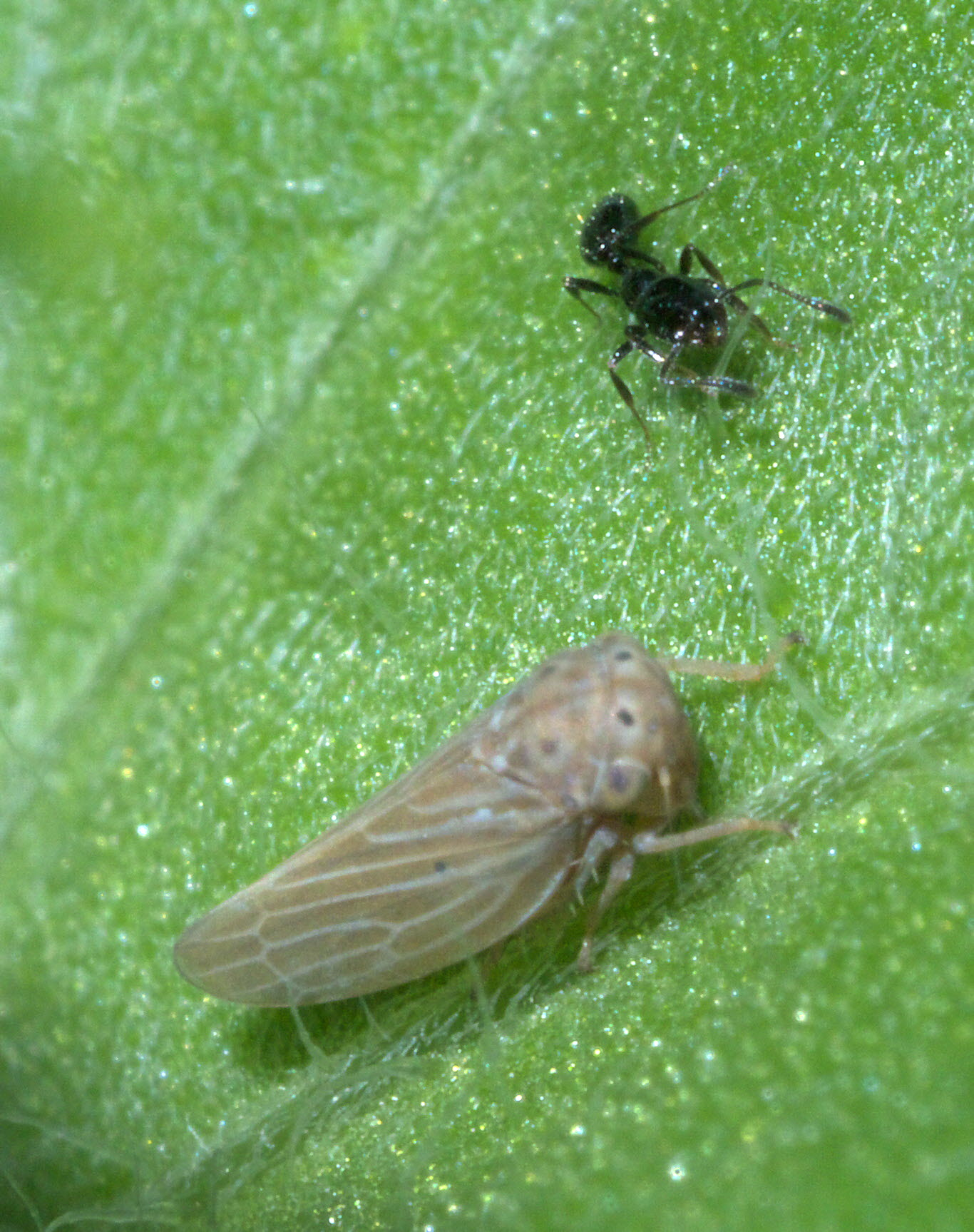
Agallia quadripunctata

== Species ==
The Global Biodiversity Information Facility lists

1. Agallia abnormis Oman, 1938
2. Agallia abstructa Scudder, 1890
3. Agallia adunca Nielson & Godoy, 1995
4. Agallia albidula Uhler, 1895
5. Agallia albovenosa Fieber, 1868
6. Agallia aliena Fieber, 1868
7. Agallia alvarengai Dutra, 1971
8. Agallia assimilis (Stål, 1862)
9. Agallia atra Oman, 1934
10. Agallia atromaculata Oman, 1938
11. Agallia barretti Ball, 1900
12. Agallia basalis Oman, 1938
13. Agallia basifusca Oman, 1938
14. Agallia bicolor Oman, 1933
15. Agallia bicornis Linnavuori & Heller, 1961
16. Agallia bidactylata Oman, 1933
17. Agallia bifurcata Oman, 1938
18. Agallia blanda Oman, 1938
19. Agallia brachyptera (Boheman, 1847)
20. Agallia brasiliana Dutra, 1966
21. Agallia brevicauda Oman, 1938
22. Agallia carioca Dutra, 1966
23. Agallia catiae Gonçalves, Mejdalani & Nova Coelho, 2007
24. Agallia caudata Oman, 1938
25. Agallia cetra Kramer, 1964
26. Agallia cezia Dutra, 1967
27. Agallia clara Oman, 1938
28. Agallia cobera Kramer, 1964
29. Agallia complexa Nielson & Godoy, 1995
30. Agallia configurata Oman, 1933
31. Agallia consobrina Curtis, 1833 - type species
32. Agallia constricta Van Duzee, 1894
33. Agallia copiosa Dutra & Nova Coelho, 1990
34. Agallia cordata Dlabola, 1981
35. Agallia corneola Nielson & Godoy, 1995
36. Agallia cornuta Cwikla & DeLong, 1985
37. Agallia corumba Oman, 1938
38. Agallia costaricensis Dmitriev, 2020
39. Agallia cubana Oman, 1933
40. Agallia cucata Kramer, 1964
41. Agallia cuneata Cogan, 1916
42. Agallia deleta Van Duzee, 1909
43. Agallia depleta Oman, 1938
44. Agallia dissimilis Dutra, 1976
45. Agallia distincta Viraktamath, 1980
46. Agallia dorsalis Lethierry, 1876
47. Agallia dorsata Oman, 1938
48. Agallia estebana Linnavuori & DeLong, 1979
49. Agallia evansi Viraktamath, 1980
50. Agallia excavata Oman, 1933
51. Agallia extensa Oman, 1938
52. Agallia fascigera Uhler, 1895
53. Agallia firdausica Dlabola, 1981
54. Agallia flaccida Scudder, 1890
55. Agallia fluminensis Nova Coelho & Dutra, 1992
56. Agallia freytagi Linnavuori & DeLong, 1979
57. Agallia fumida Oman, 1938
58. Agallia furcostyli Viraktamath, 1980
59. Agallia hansoni Nielson & Godoy, 1995
60. Agallia harpis Cwikla & DeLong, 1985
61. Agallia hispanica Horvath, 1900
62. Agallia hottentotta Linnavuori, 1961
63. Agallia hyalina Oman, 1938
64. Agallia incerta Oman, 1938
65. Agallia incisa Oman, 1938
66. Agallia incongrua Oman, 1938
67. Agallia inexpectata Linnavuori, 1956
68. Agallia ingens Oman, 1933
69. Agallia inornata Oman, 1938
70. Agallia instabilis Scudder, 1890
71. Agallia insularis Berg, 1884
72. Agallia intermedia Lethierry, 1874
73. Agallia interrogationis Osborn, 1923
74. Agallia kosmetron Kramer, 1976
75. Agallia lauta (Stål, 1862)
76. Agallia leda Linnavuori, 1971
77. Agallia lewisii Scudder, 1890
78. Agallia lindbergi Metcalf, 1955
79. Agallia lineata Osborn, 1923
80. Agallia lingula Van Duzee, 1907
81. Agallia lingulata Olsen, 1922
82. Agallia linnavuorii Quartau, 1971
83. Agallia liturata Van Duzee, 1908
84. Agallia longicauda Linnavuori & DeLong, 1979
85. Agallia manaosa Oman, 1938
86. Agallia manauara Nova Coelho & Dutra, 1992
87. Agallia mauritanica Villiers, 1956
88. Agallia minuenda Oman, 1938
89. Agallia minuta Melichar, 1896
90. Agallia modesta Osborn & Ball, 1897
91. Agallia modestoides Linnavuori, 1956
92. Agallia munda Oman, 1933
93. Agallia mutilata Breddin, 1897
94. Agallia neoalbidula Oman, 1938
95. Agallia nielsoni Freytag, 2003
96. Agallia nigerrima Oman, 1938
97. Agallia obesa Oman, 1933
98. Agallia obscuripennis (Blanchard, 1852)
99. Agallia obsoleta Fieber, 1868
100. Agallia oceanides Linnavuori, 1960
101. Agallia panamensis Linnavuori & DeLong, 1979
102. Agallia paraguayensis Linnavuori, 1956
103. Agallia parvicauda Linnavuori, 1961
104. Agallia paulistana Dutra, 1972
105. Agallia pecki Freytag, 2003
106. Agallia peneconstricta Oman, 1933
107. Agallia peregrinans (Stål, 1859)
108. Agallia phalerata (Stål, 1859)
109. Agallia pina Cwikla & DeLong, 1985
110. Agallia plana (Butler, 1877)
111. Agallia producta Osborn & Ball, 1898
112. Agallia pulchra DeLong & Wolcott, 1923
113. Agallia pumila Oman, 1971
114. Agallia pyreneica Dlabola, 1984
115. Agallia quadrata Oman, 1938
116. Agallia repleta Van Duzee, 1907
117. Agallia rotunda Freytag, 2003
118. Agallia rubicundula Berg, 1884
119. Agallia sabulicola Lindberg, 1948
120. Agallia sagittifer Linnavuori, 1968
121. Agallia santarema Linnavuori & DeLong, 1979
122. Agallia sara Baker, 1923
123. Agallia saxicola Logvinenko, 1983
124. Agallia serrana Dutra, 1969
125. Agallia silvai Nova Coelho & Dutra, 1992
126. Agallia simplex Nielson & Godoy, 1995
127. Agallia sinchona Linnavuori & DeLong, 1979
128. Agallia sinica Jacobi, 1944
129. Agallia soosi Linnavuori, 1956
130. Agallia stenagalloides Viraktamath, 1980
131. Agallia striolaris (Butler, 1877)
132. Agallia subflava Dutra & Nova Coelho, 1992
133. Agallia teapae Oman, 1934
134. Agallia thomasiana Linnavuori, 1956
135. Agallia una Dutra, 1974
136. Agallia varzeana Dutra, 1970
137. Agallia viraktamathi Dlabola, 1972
138. Agallia xavieri Lindberg, 1960
