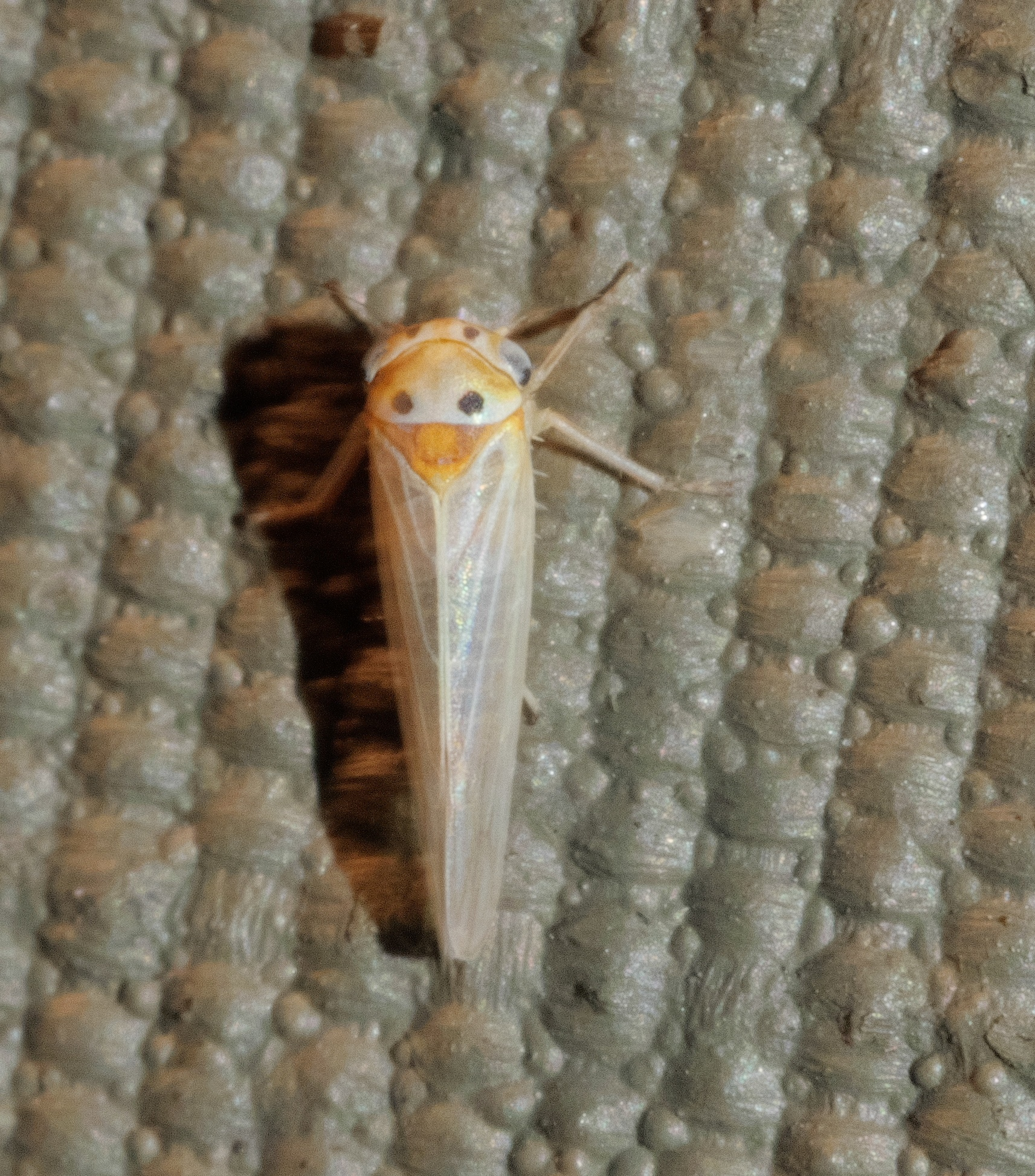
- Austroagallia, Botswana

Scientific classification
- Kingdom: Animalia
- Phylum: Arthropoda
- Clade: Pancrustacea
- Class: Insecta
- Order: Hemiptera
- Suborder: Auchenorrhyncha
- Family: Cicadellidae
- Subfamily: Megophthalminae
- Tribe: Agalliini
- Subtribe: Agalliina
- Genus: Austroagallia; Evans, 1935

Synonyms
- Austragallia Evans, 1935; Egerna Zakhvatkin, 1949; Paragallia Ribaut, 1948; Peragaleia Ribaut, 1948; Peragalia Ribaut, 1948; Peragallia Ribaut, 1948

= Austroagallia =

Genus of leafhoppers

Austroagallia is a genus of typical leafhoppers in the family Cicadellidae. There are more than 20 described species in Austroagallia.

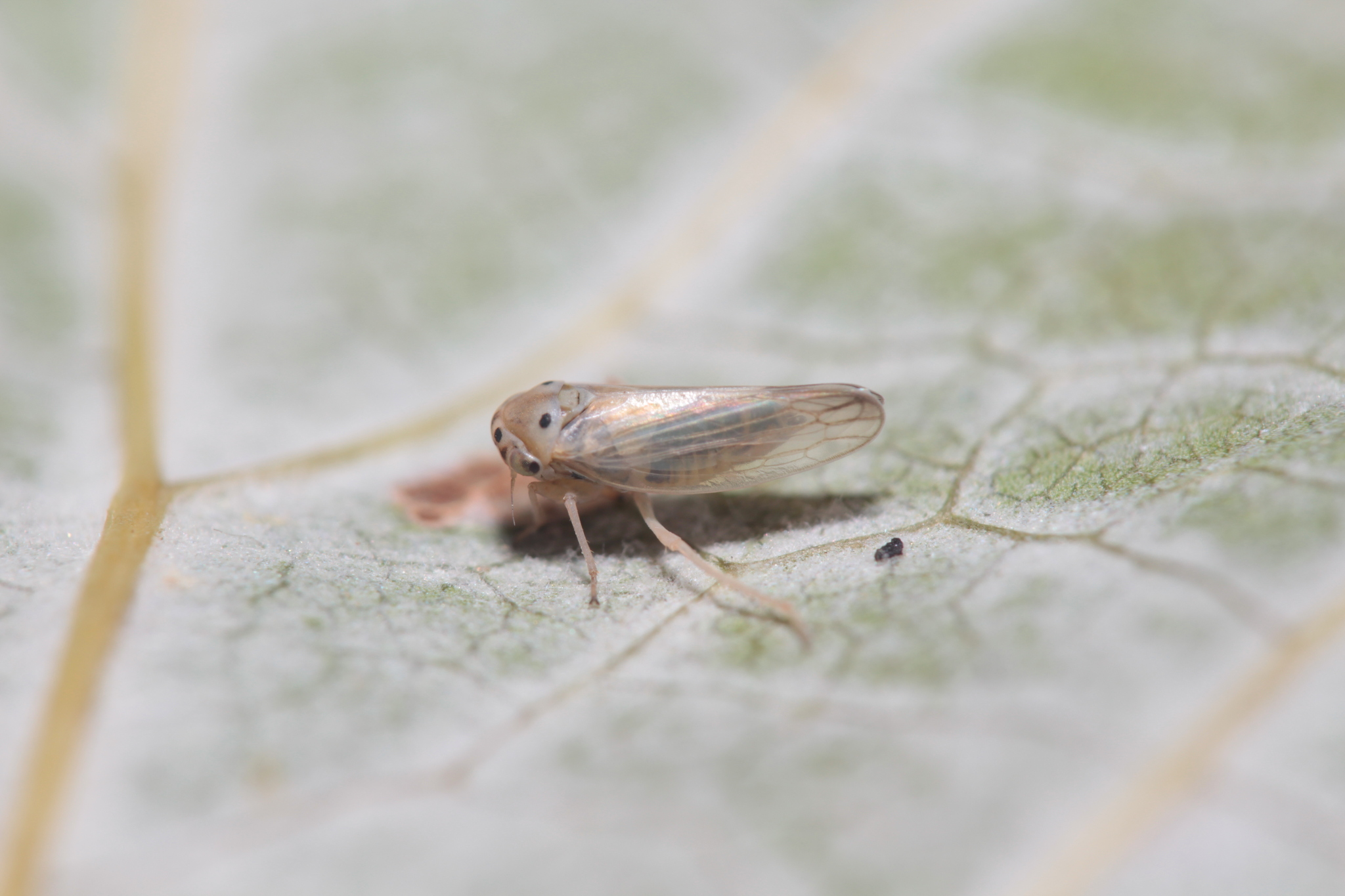
Austroagallia sinuata, Austria

== Species ==
These species belong to the genus Austroagallia:

- Austroagallia aegyptiaca (Nast, 1939) (Egypt and Morocco)
- Austroagallia antaoensis (Lindberg, 1958)
- Austroagallia avicula (Ribaut, 1935) (Palearctic)
- Austroagallia balii Viraktamath, 2011 (Indonesia and Bali)
- Austroagallia caboverdensis (Lindberg, 1958) (Africa)
- Austroagallia canopus Linnavuori, 1969 (Egypt)
- Austroagallia distanti Viraktamath, 2011 (India)
- Austroagallia fagonica Sawai Singh & Gill, 1973 (India, Pakistan, Sri Lanka)
- Austroagallia flavovenosa (Evans, 1955) (Africa)
- Austroagallia fogoensis (Lindberg, 1958)
- Austroagallia hieroglyphica (Lindberg, 1958)
- Austroagallia hilaris (Horváth, 1909) (Africa)
- Austroagallia macchiae (Lindberg, 1954) (Africa)
- Austroagallia mera (Van Duzee, 1937) (Galápagos Islands)
- Austroagallia monteverdensis (Lindberg, 1958)
- Austroagallia monticola (Lindberg, 1958)
- Austroagallia nigrasterna (Cogan, 1916) (South Africa)
- Austroagallia nitobei (Matsumura, 1912) (Asia)
- Austroagallia prachuabensis Viraktamath, 2011 (Southeast Asia)
- Austroagallia quadricornis (Linnavuori, 1962) (Egypt and Israel)
- Austroagallia robusta Sawai Singh & Gill, 1973 (India, Pakistan)
- Austroagallia sarobica (Dlabola, 1964) (southern Asia)
- Austroagallia sinuata (Mulsant & Rey, 1855) (Palearctic)
- Austroagallia torrida Evans, 1936 (Australia, Pacific islands, Southeast Asia)
- Austroagallia usambarensis (Melichar, 1908) (Africa)
- Austroagallia zachvatkini (Vilbaste, 1961) (Palearctic)
