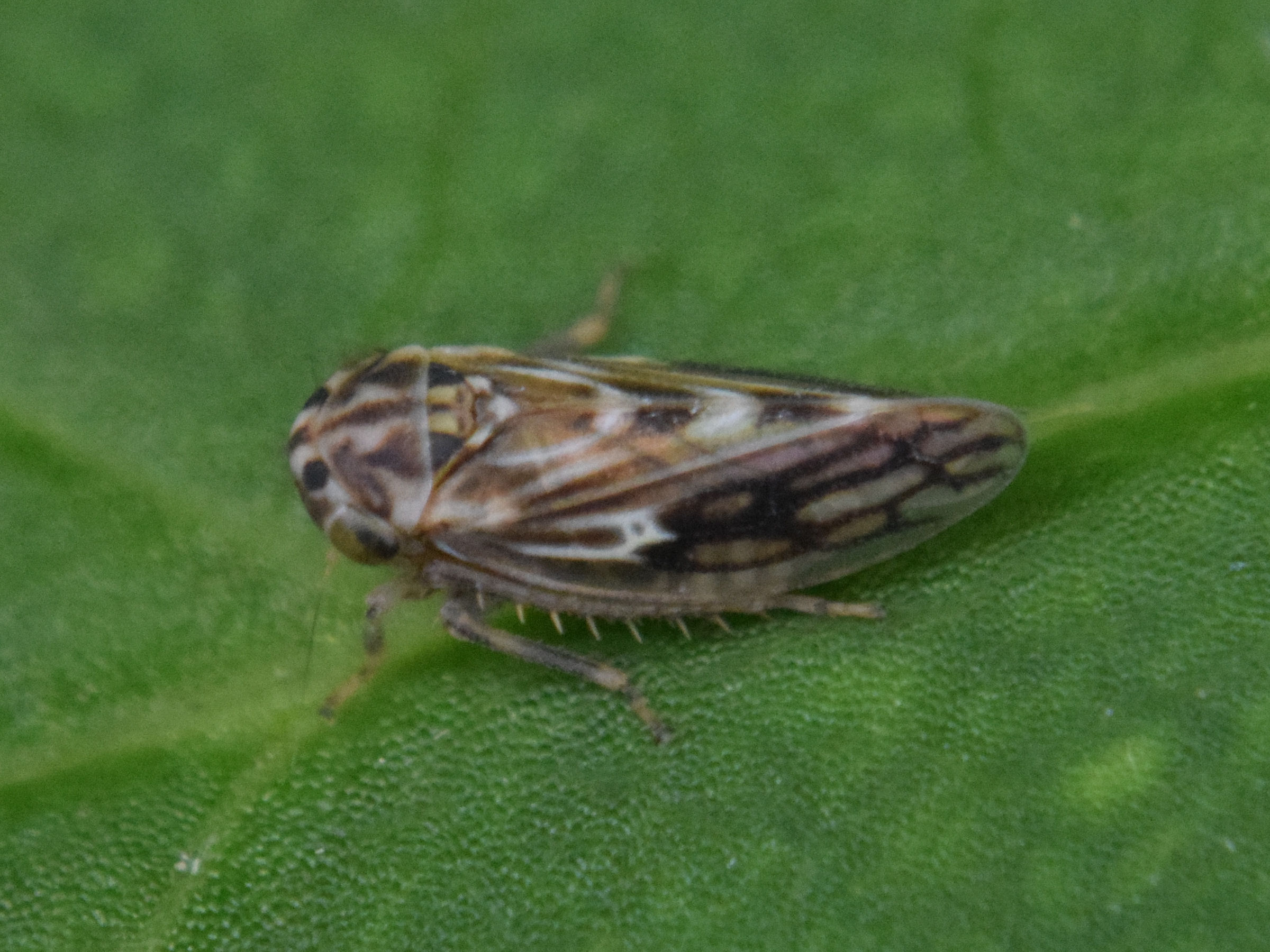
- Agallia consobrina

Scientific classification
- Domain: Eukaryota
- Kingdom: Animalia
- Phylum: Arthropoda
- Class: Insecta
- Order: Hemiptera
- Suborder: Auchenorrhyncha
- Family: Cicadellidae
- Subfamily: Megophthalminae; Kirkaldy, 1906

= Megophthalminae =

Subfamily of leafhoppers

Megophthalminae is a subfamily of leafhoppers; it includes genera included in the former subfamily Agalliinae.

== Tribes and genera ==
BioLib includes four tribes:

=== Adelungiini ===
Authority: Baker, 1915

subtribe Achrina Davis, 1975

1. Achrus Lindberg, 1925
2. Bergevina Evans, 1947
3. Zubara Al-Ne'amy & Linnavuori, 1982

subtribe Adelungiina Baker, 1915

1. Adelungia Melichar, 1902
2. Assiuta Linnavuori, 1969
3. Dalus Emeljanov, 1975
4. Emelyanogramma Koçak, 1981
5. Melicharella Semenov, 1902
6. Paramacroceps Bergevin, 1926
7. Platyproctus Lindberg, 1925
8. Pleopardus Emeljanov, 1975
9. Spathicerula Gnezdilov, 2023
10. Symphypyga Haupt, 1917

subtribe Peyerimhoffiolina Al-Ne'amy & Linnavuori, 1982

1. Peyerimhoffiola Bergevin, 1928

=== Agalliini ===
Authority: Kirkaldy, 1901

subtribe Agalliina Kirkaldy, 1901

1. Agalita Evans, 1957
2. Agallia Curtis, 1833
3. Agalliana Oman, 1933
4. Agallidwipa Viraktamath & Gonçalves, 2013
5. Agalliopsis Kirkaldy, 1907
6. Alloproctus Bergroth, 1924
7. Anaceratagallia Zachvatkin, 1943
8. Austroagallia Evans, 1935
9. Bergallia Oman, 1938
10. Brasa (leafhopper) Oman, 1938
11. Brasopsis Linnavuori, 1954
12. Ceratagallia Kirkaldy, 1907
13. Chigallia Linnavuori & DeLong, 1977
14. Chromagallia Linnavuori, 1954
15. Dryodurgades Zachvatkin, 1946
16. Durgades Distant, 1912
17. Euragallia Oman, 1937
18. Exagallia Freytag, 2011
19. Fibragallia Nielson, 1999
20. Gannachrus Theron, 1979
21. Gunhilda (leafhopper) Distant, 1918
22. Hemagallia Viraktamath, 2011
23. Humpatagallia Linnavuori & Viraktamath, 1973
24. Ianagallia Viraktamath, 2011
25. Idioceroides Matsumura, 1912
26. Igerna Kirkaldy, 1903
27. Indiagallia Holzinger, 2001
28. Japanagallia Ishihara, 1955
29. Krameragallia Gonçalves & Nielson, 2011
30. Kuscheliola Evans, 1957
31. Latusagallia Nielson & Godoy, 1995
32. Leopallia Gnezdilov, 2002
33. Megagallia Linnavuori, 1954
34. Melanoria Gnezdilov, 2001
35. Mesagallia Zachvatkin, 1946
36. Neorubragallia Gonçalves & Dietrich, 2013
37. Omanagallia Dietrich, 1993
38. Onukigallia Ishihara, 1955
39. Ozias - monotypic Ozias pedester Jacobi, 1912
40. Purvigallia Viraktamath, Dai & Zhang, 2012
41. Rubragallia Gonçalves & Dietrich, 2013
42. Sinoagallia Viraktamath, Dai & Zhang, 2012
43. Skandagallia Viraktamath, Dai & Zhang, 2012
44. Stenagallia Evans, 1957
45. Stonasla White, 1878
46. Sungallia Viraktamath, Dai & Zhang, 2012

subtribe Durgulina Gnezdilov, 2001

1. Calades Gnezdilov, 2001
2. Durgula Emeljanov, 1964

subtribe Nehelina Zachvatkin, 1946

1. Nehela White, 1878

unplaced

1. Formallia Viraktamath, 2011
2. Multinervis Li & Li, 2013
3. Nandigallia Viraktamath, 2011
4. Paulagallia Viraktamath, 2011
5. Sangeeta (leafhopper) Viraktamath, 2011
6. Spinoagallia Li & Li, 2012

tribe Evansiolini Linnavuori & DeLong, 1977

1. Evansiola China, 1957

=== Megophthalmini ===
Authority: Kirkaldy, 1906

1. Brenda (leafhopper) Oman, 1941
2. Coronophtus Van Stalle, 1983
3. Dananea Linnavuori, 1972
4. Diablophthalmus Dietrich, 2022
5. Megophthalmus Curtis, 1833
6. Odomas Jacobi, 1912
7. Paropulopa Fieber, 1866
8. Tiaja Oman, 1941

incertae sedis (fossil)

- †Eomegophthalmus Dietrich & Gonçalves, 2014
