= Ozias pedester =

Scientific classification
- Kingdom: Animalia
- Phylum: Arthropoda
- Clade: Pancrustacea
- Class: Insecta
- Order: Hemiptera
- Suborder: Auchenorrhyncha
- Family: Cicadellidae
- Subfamily: Megophthalminae
- Tribe: Agalliini
- Subtribe: Agalliina
- Genus: Ozias; Jacobi, 1912
- Species: O. pedester

Binomial name
- Ozias pedester Jacobi, 1912

Genus of true bugs

Ozias is a monotypic genus of African leafhoppers in the subfamily Megophthalminae and tribe Agalliini, containing the single species Ozias pedester, erected by Arnold Jacobi in 1912.
