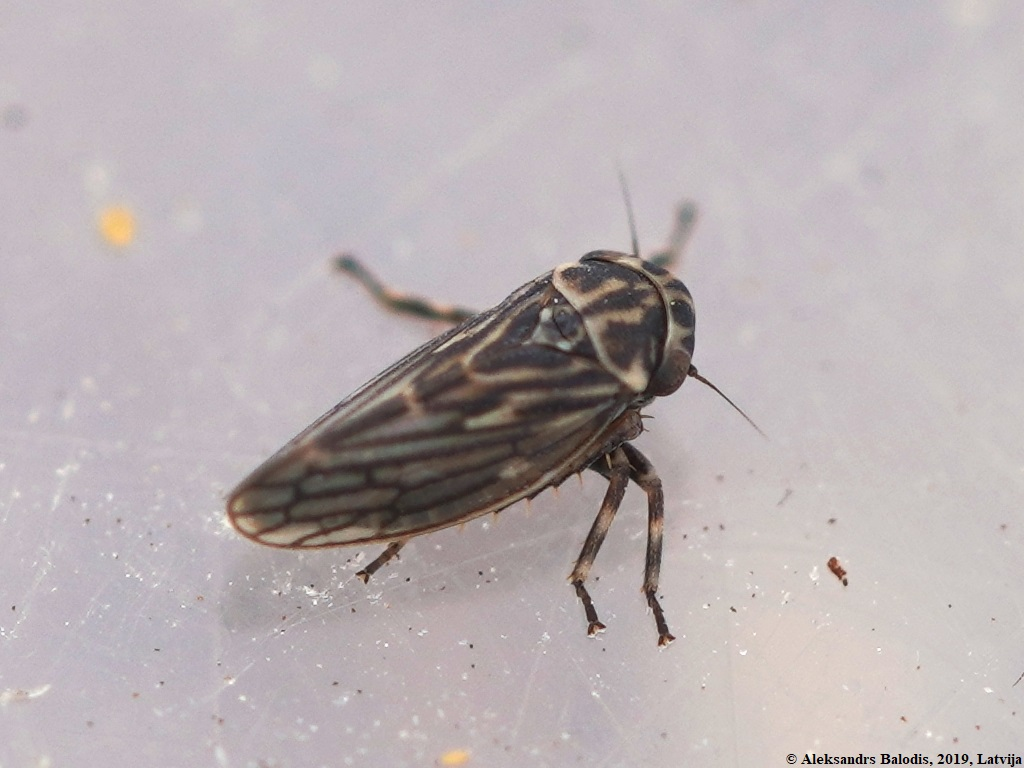
- Anaceratagallia venosa

Scientific classification
- Domain: Eukaryota
- Kingdom: Animalia
- Phylum: Arthropoda
- Class: Insecta
- Order: Hemiptera
- Suborder: Auchenorrhyncha
- Family: Cicadellidae
- Genus: Anaceratagallia; Zachvatkin, 1946

Extant species
- Anaceratagallia estonica; Anaceratagallia venosa

= Anaceratagallia =

Genus of beetles

Anaceratagallia is a genus of insects belonging to the family Cicadellidae.

The genus was first described by Aleksei Zachvatkin in 1946.

The species of this genus are found in Eurasia and Africa.

Species:

- Anaceratagallia estonica
- Anaceratagallia venosa
