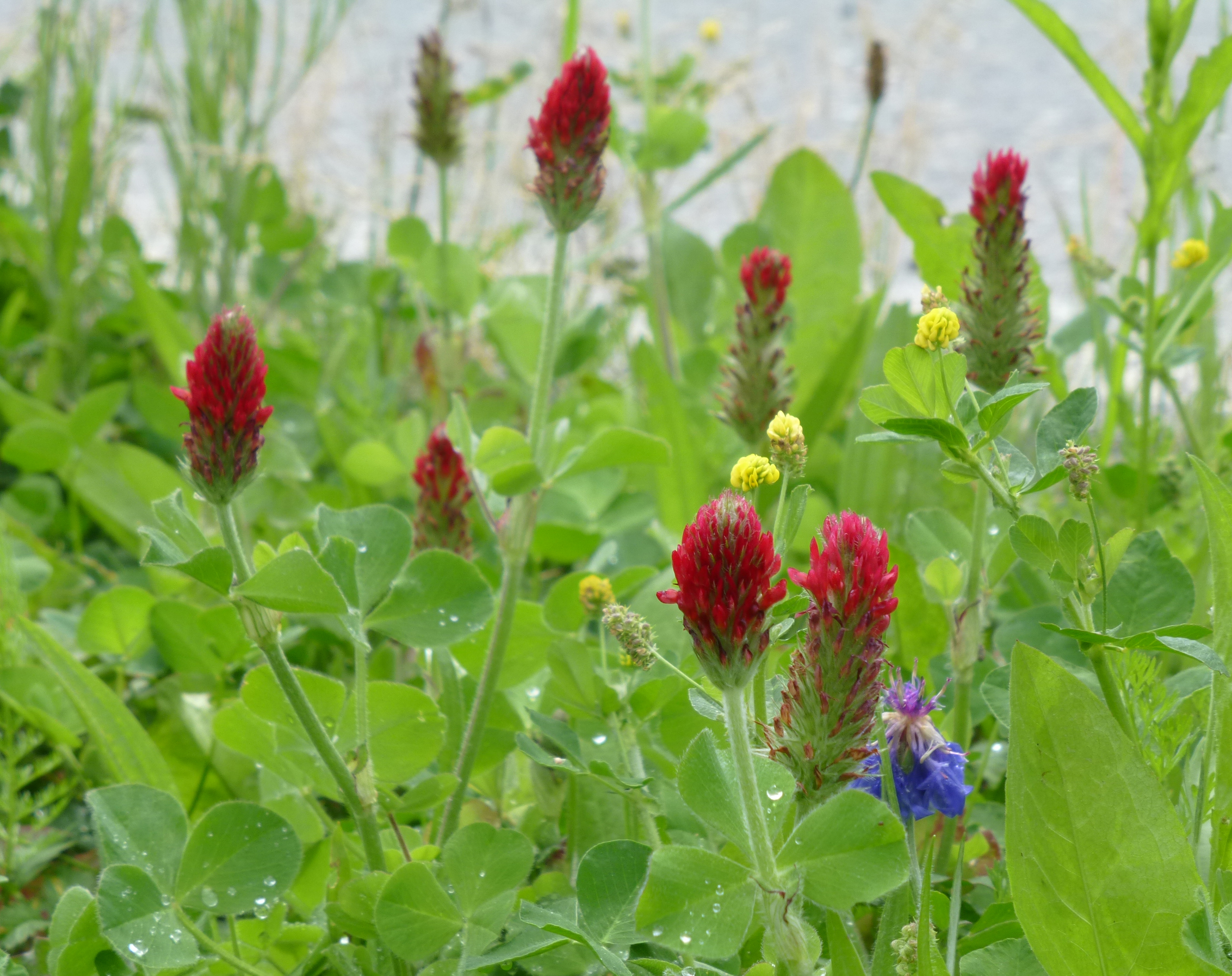
- Trifolium incarnatum subsp. incarnatum, Austria

Conservation status
- Least Concern (IUCN 3.1)

Scientific classification
- Kingdom: Plantae
- Clade: Tracheophytes
- Clade: Angiosperms
- Clade: Eudicots
- Clade: Rosids
- Order: Fabales
- Family: Fabaceae
- Subfamily: Faboideae
- Genus: Trifolium
- Species: T. incarnatum

Binomial name
- Trifolium incarnatum L.

= Trifolium incarnatum =

Crimson clover

Species of flowering plant

Trifolium incarnatum, known as crimson clover is a species of herbaceous flowering plant in the family Fabaceae. It is native to Eurasia.

== Description ==
This upright annual herb grows to 20–50 centimetres (8–20 in) tall, unbranched or branched only at the base. The leaves are trifoliate with a long petiole, each leaflet hairy, 8–16 millimetres (3/8–5/8 in) across, with a truncated or bilobed apex.

The flowers are produced throughout the spring and summer, creamy white to rich red or crimson, congested on an elongated spike inflorescence 3–5 cm (1 1/4–2 in) tall and 1.5 cm broad; the individual flowers are up to 10–13 mm long and have five petals. The banner of each flower does not sit upright, but folds forward.

== Taxonomy ==
Two subspecies are accepted by many authorities, though the Plants of the World Online database does not currently distinguish them.

- Trifolium incarnatum subsp. incarnatum (crimson clover). Erect, to 50 cm tall; stem hairs spreading; flowers bright red (crimson), with the petals similar length to the calyx or only slightly longer. Possibly genuinely native only in southeast Europe; a neophyte in Britain, and widely cultivated as a crop and fodder plant.
- Trifolium incarnatum subsp. molinerii (Hornem.) Ces. (long-headed clover). Smaller, to 20 cm tall or prostrate; stem hairs appressed; flowers creamy white to pale pink, with the petals much longer than the calyx. Native in Britain, where it is confined coastal sites in Cornwall, Devon and Jersey as a native plant; also native in France and the northern Mediterranean region.

== Distribution and habitat ==
The species is native to most of Europe and southwest Asia.

In mild winter areas, crimson clover typically behaves as a winter annual. The seeds germinate in the first rains of late summer or autumn. The plants grow through the winter, and have a major flush of flowering in late spring. In dry summer climates like the Mediterranean, the plants die after maturing seeds. In sites having sufficient summer moisture, plants can continue growth and flowering; and may even behave as short-lived perennials. The plant uses associations with Rhizobium bacteria to fix nitrogen.

== Cultivation and uses ==
Away from its native areas, crimson clover has been introduced to many other areas, including northwestern Africa, Australia, Chile, India, Japan, Pakistan and the United States. Crimson clover is commonly used in agriculture as a nitrogen-fixing cover crop. The plant is widely grown as a protein-rich forage crop for cattle and other livestock, and is suitable to be made into hay. It is commonly grazed by domestic and wild ruminants. It is often used for roadside erosion control, as well as beautification, however it can exclude other desirable spring and early-summer species of native vegetation in the area where it is planted. It is sown as quickly as possible after the removal of a grain crop at the rate of 20–22 kg/ha. It is found to succeed better when only the surface of the soil is stirred by the scarifier and harrow than when ploughed. It grows rapidly in spring, and yields an abundant crop of greenery. Only one cutting, however, can be obtained, as it does not shoot again after being mown.

Crimson clover flowers and seedling sprouts are edible, and similar in taste and appearance to alfalfa sprouts. They can be added as an ingredient in salads, sandwiches, and other dishes, made into tisanes, and can be dried and ground into flour. 100 g of crimson clover sprouts contains 23 calories, 4 g of protein, 2 g of fibre, and provides 38 percent of the RDI of vitamin K, as well as 14 percent of the RDI of vitamin C. It has extremely small amounts of calcium, iron, phosphorus, zinc, selenium and magnesium. Like all sprouts eaten raw, there is a risk of contamination with Escherichia coli, Salmonella, Listeria, and Bacillus cereus. However, many reputable facilities attempt to regulate and test these crops for such bacteria.

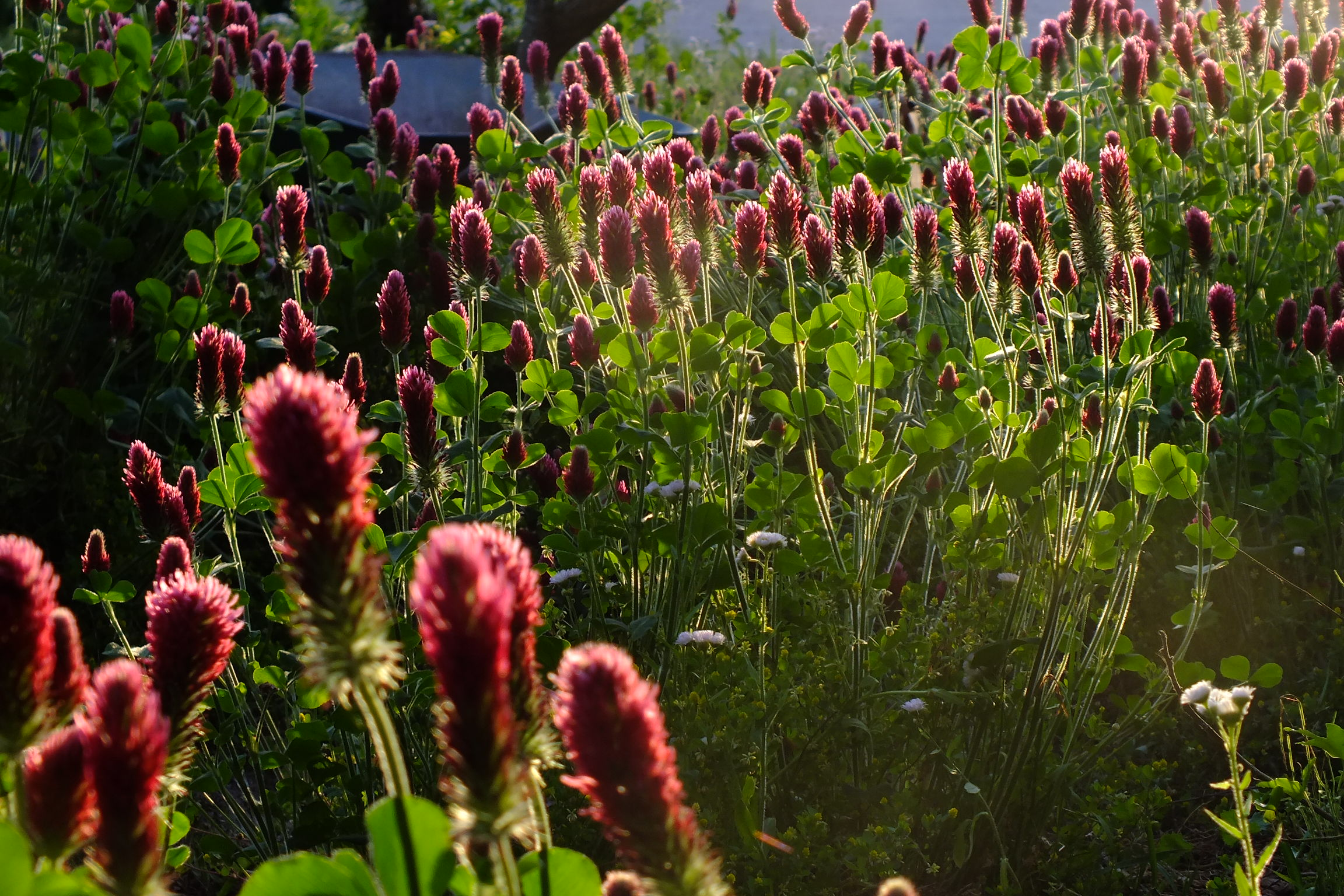
The cultivar 'Strawberry Candle' in a garden in Hyogo, Japan

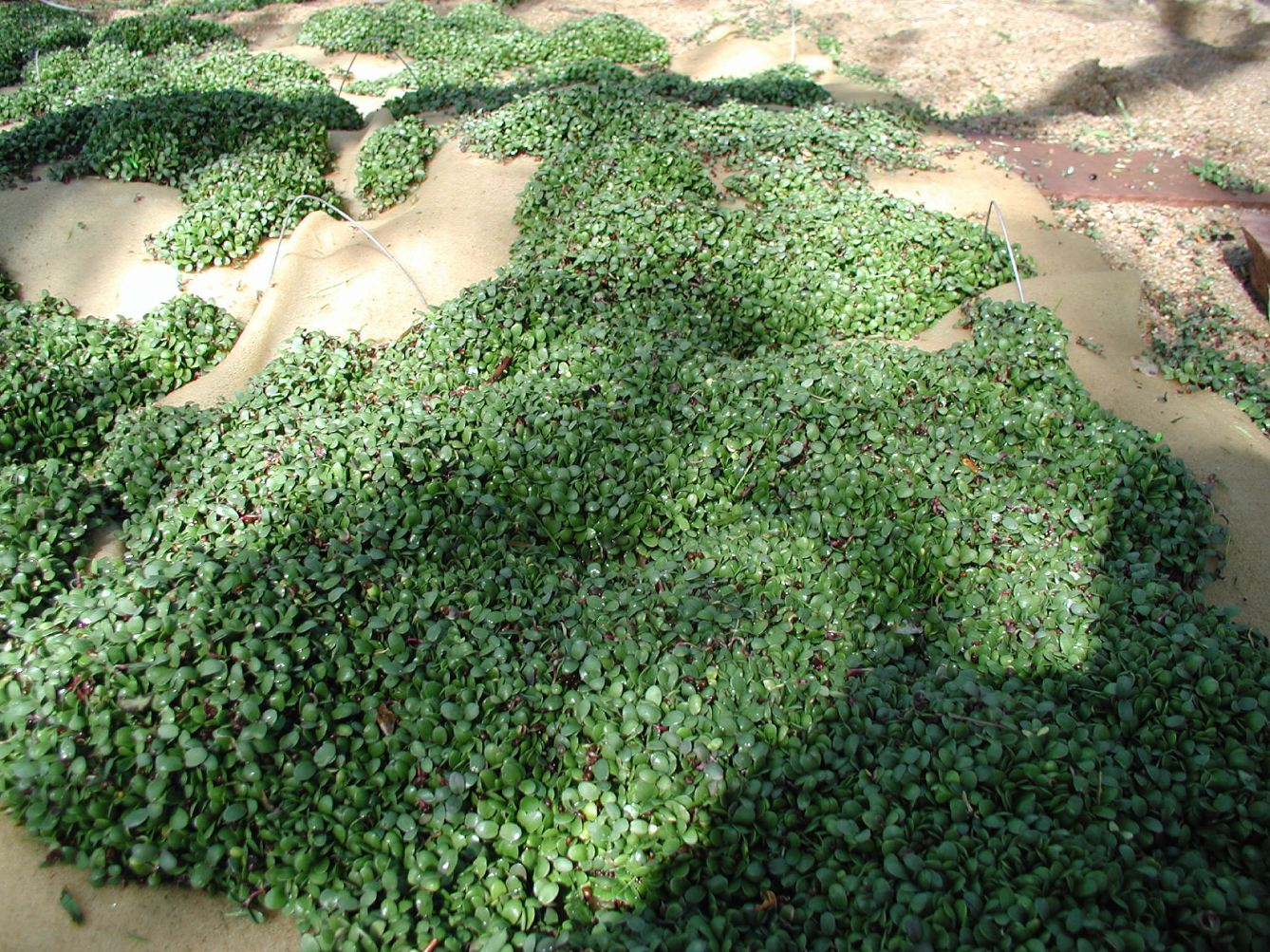
Farming of germinated plants
