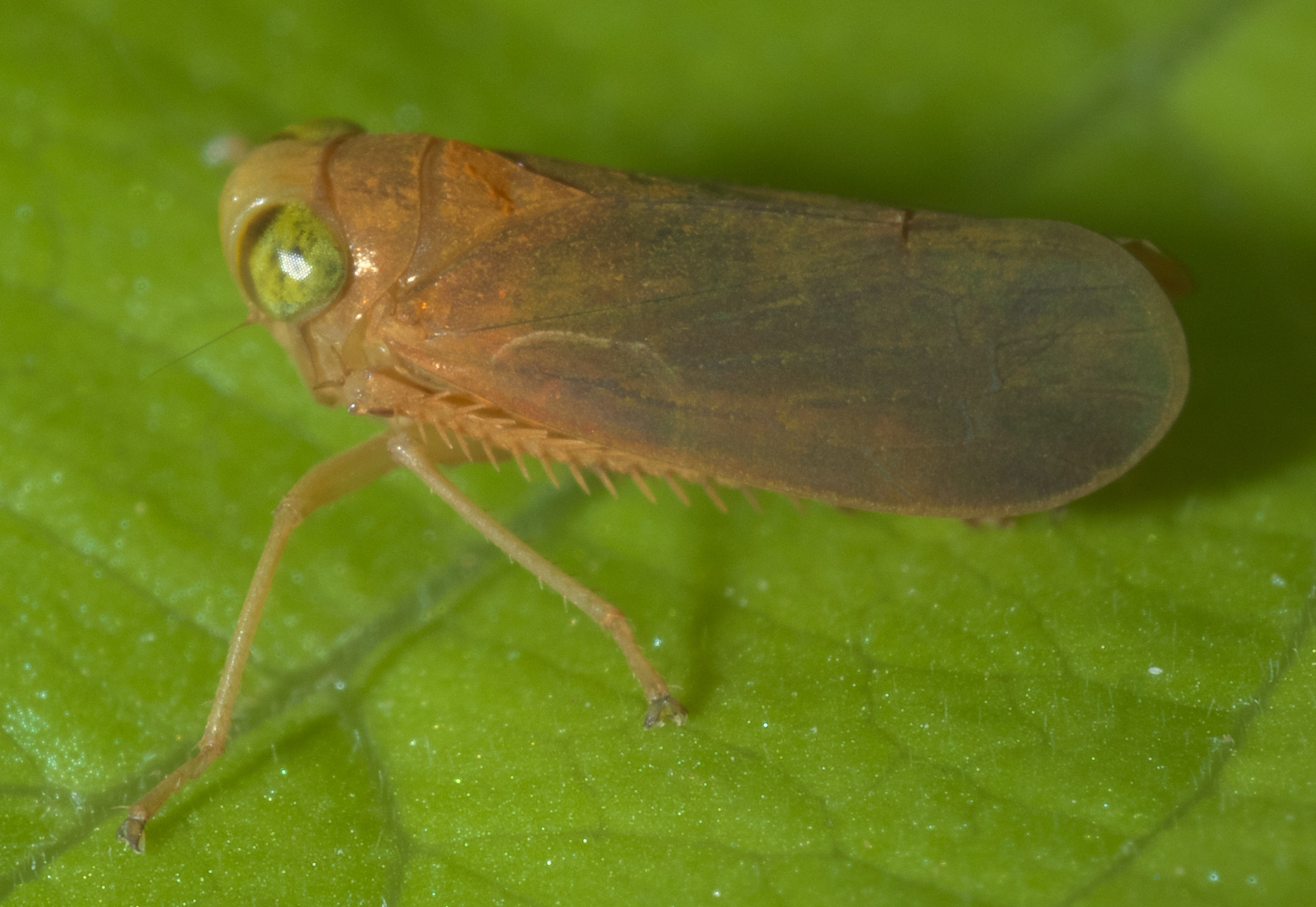
- Jikradia olitoria

Scientific classification
- Kingdom: Animalia
- Phylum: Arthropoda
- Clade: Pancrustacea
- Class: Insecta
- Order: Hemiptera
- Suborder: Auchenorrhyncha
- Family: Cicadellidae
- Subfamily: Coelidiinae
- Tribe: Teruliini
- Genus: Jikradia
- Species: J. olitoria

Binomial name
- Jikradia olitoria (Say, 1830)

Synonyms
- List: Jassus olitorius Say, 1830; Coelidia olitoria (Say, 1830); Jassus subbifasciatus Say, 1830; Jassus subfasciatus Harris, 1835 (Missp.); Coelidia subrifasciata Walker, 1852 (Missp.); Jassus fascipennis Spångberg, 1878; Jassus borealis Spångberg, 1879; Coelidia semifasciata Uhler, 1884; Coelidia olitaria Osborn, 1892 (Missp.); Jassus subfaciatus Southwick, 1892 (Missp.); Jassus fuscipennis Van Duzee, 1894 (Missp.); Jassus bifasciatus Smith, 1900 (Missp.); Jassus clitorius Snow, 1904 (Missp.); Jassus olitarius Smith, 1910 (Missp.); Jassus oblitorius Moore, 1944 (Missp.); Jassus alitorius Thornberry, 1954 (Missp.)

= Jikradia olitoria =

Species of leafhopper

Jikradia olitoria, or the coppery leafhopper, is a species of leafhopper (family Cicadellidae) found mainly in eastern North America. The insect acts as a vector for the North American grapevine yellows.

Jikradia olitoria leafhopper nymph on sweet corn leaf (nearly eight millimeters long)

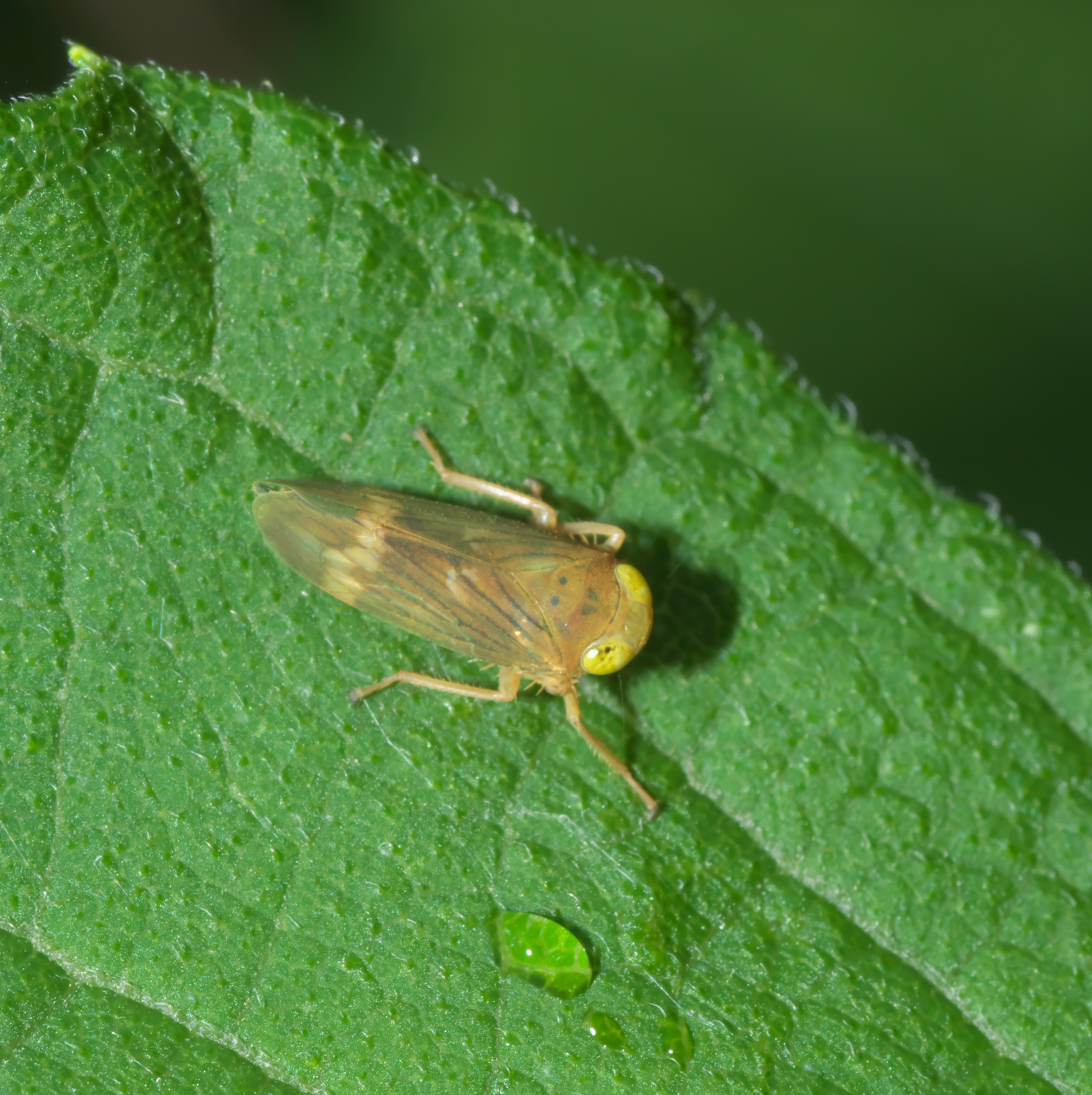
Jikradia olitoria

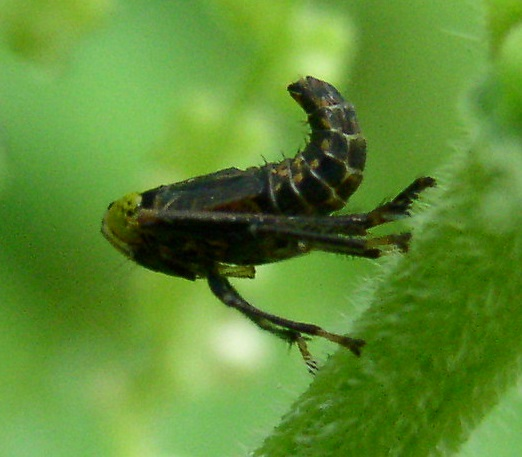
Nymph
