= Limentinus =

Scientific classification
- Kingdom: Animalia
- Phylum: Arthropoda
- Class: Insecta
- Order: Hemiptera
- Suborder: Auchenorrhyncha
- Family: Cicadellidae
- Subfamily: Coelidiinae
- Genus: Limentinus; Distant, 1917

Genus of leafhoppers

Limentinus is a genus of African leafhoppers in the subfamily Coelidiinae and tribe Coelidiini, erected by William Lucas Distant in 1917.

== Species ==
The World Auchenorrhyncha Database includes:

1. Limentinus aldabranus Distant, 1917
2. Limentinus bracchius Nielson, 1991
3. Limentinus cambouei (Signoret, 1886)
4. Limentinus declinatus Wang, Dietrich & Zhang, 2018
5. Limentinus nielsoni Gnezdilov, 2021
6. Limentinus nigrifacies Gnezdilov, 2021
7. Limentinus oryx Gnezdilov, 2021
8. Limentinus sagittus Nielson, 1991
9. Limentinus varius Nielson, 1991
