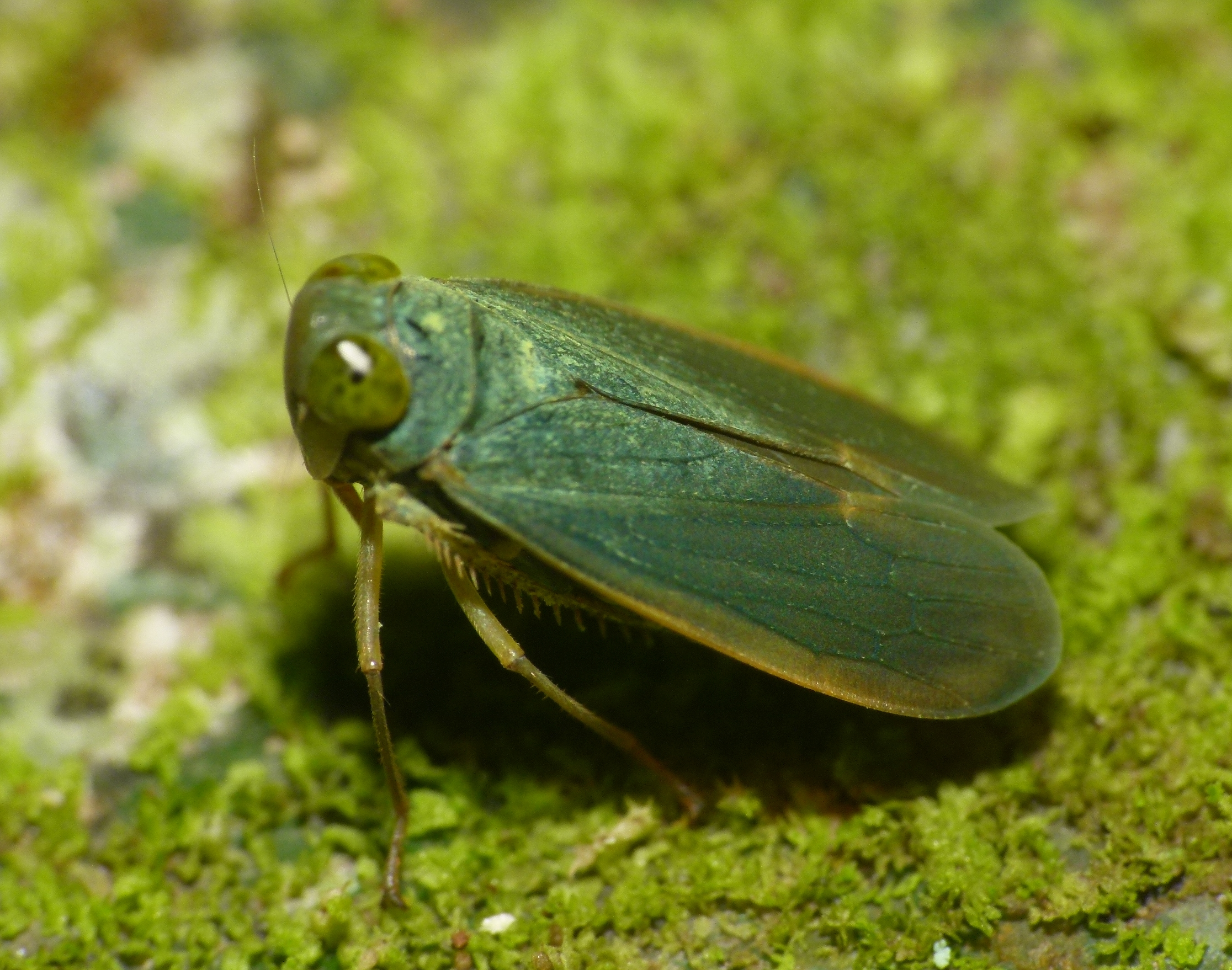
- Calodia sp.

Scientific classification
- Kingdom: Animalia
- Phylum: Arthropoda
- Clade: Pancrustacea
- Class: Insecta
- Order: Hemiptera
- Suborder: Auchenorrhyncha
- Family: Cicadellidae
- Subfamily: Coelidiinae; Dohrn, 1859

Tribes
- Coelidiini; Gabritini; Hikangiini; Macroceratogoniini; Sandersellini; Teruliini; Thagriini; Tharrini; Tinobregmini; Youngolidiini

= Coelidiinae =

Subfamily of leafhoppers

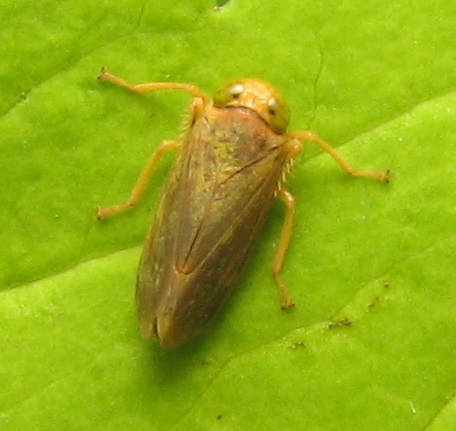
Jikradia olitoria

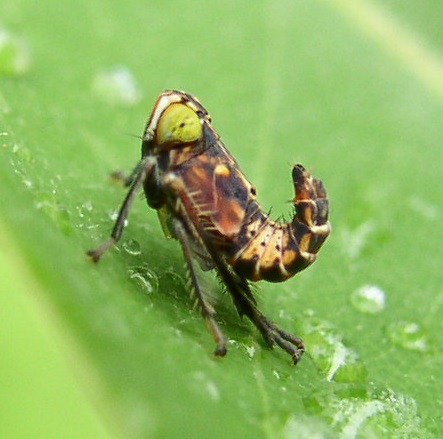
Jikradia olitoria nymph

Coelidiinae is a subfamily of leafhoppers in the family Cicadellidae. There are currently (2025) 10 tribes and over 1400 species in Coelidiinae.

== Tribes and genera ==
The subfamily Coelidiinae is made up of 10 tribes, with the numbers of genera and species subject to review.

=== Coelidiini ===
Authority: Dohrn CA, 1859 - most continents

1. Africoelidia Nielson, 1982
2. Afrolidia Nielson, 1992
3. Amplicoelidia Nielson, 1992
4. Apophydia Nielson, 1996
5. Armaturolidia Nielson, 2011
6. Baseprocessa Fan & Li, 2017
7. Boliviela DeLong, 1969
8. Brasura Nielson, 1982
9. Brevolidia Nielson, 1982
10. Calodia Nielson, 1982
11. Calodicia Nielson, 1982
12. Carinoscapula Nielson, 2011
13. Cladolidia Nielson, 2015
14. Clypeolidia Nielson, 1982
15. Codilia Nielson, 1982
16. Coelidia Germar, 1821
17. Collasuyusana Nielson, 2011
18. Crassinolanus Nielson, 1982
19. Creberulidia Nielson, 2015
20. †Cretacoelidia Wang, Dietrich & Zhang, 2018
21. Crinolidia Nielson, 1982
22. Crinorus Nielson, 1982
23. Daridna Walker, 1858
24. Deltolidia Nielson, 1982
25. Dentateus Li & Fan, 2017
26. Dialodia McKamey, 2006
27. Dicodia Nielson, 1982
28. Dicolecia Nielson, 1982
29. Ethiocoelidia Nielson, 1992
30. Evansolidia Nielson, 1982
31. Fistulidia Nielson, 1988
32. Flataedeagusa Fan & Li, 2017
33. Gicrantus Nielson, 1982
34. Glaberana Nielson, 2015
35. Gracilidia Nielson, 1988
36. Hamolidia Nielson, 1982
37. Hamusolidia Nielson, 2015
38. Hiatusorus Nielson, 2015
39. Jassolidia Nielson, 1982
40. Jenolidia Nielson, 1982
41. Kramerolidia Nielson, 1982
42. Krosolus Nielson, 1982
43. Laosolidia Nielson, 2015
44. Limentinus Distant, 1917
45. Lupola Nielson, 1982
46. Mahellus Nielson, 1982
47. Megalidia Nielson, 1982
48. Namibiola Theron, 1986
49. Nedangia Nielson, 1982
50. Nudulidia Nielson, 1982
51. Olidiana McKamey, 2006
52. Omanolidia Nielson, 1982
53. Orbisolidia Nielson, 2015
54. Paracodilia Wang & Zhang, 2018
55. Paradicodia Nielson & Weideman, 2017
56. Paralaosolidia Li & Fan, 2017
57. Paralidia Nielson, 1982
58. Planolidia Nielson, 1982
59. Pygmaelidia Nielson, 1988
60. Rhinocoelidia Nielson, 1991
61. Serramargina Fan & Li, 2017
62. Singillatus Nielson, 2015
63. Sliceaedeagusa Fan & Li, 2017
64. Spinolidia Nielson, 1982
65. Srabura Nielson, 1991
66. Stenocalodia Nielson, 1992
67. Stylolidia Nielson, 1986
68. Taharana Nielson, 1982
69. Theronella Nielson, 1992
70. Tialidia Nielson, 1982
71. Tinocripus Nielson, 1982
72. Trinoridia Nielson, 2015
73. Tripesidia Nielson, 2015
74. Triquetolidia Nielson, 1982
75. Tumidorus Nielson, 2015
76. Ventralprocessa Li & Fan, 2017
77. Ventrolidia Nielson, 2011
78. Webbolidia Nielson, 2015
79. Zhangolidia Nielson, 2015

Gabritini Nielson, 1983

monogeneric - S. America

1. Gabrita Walker, 1858

Hikangiini Nielson, 1983

Central and W. Africa

1. Boulardus Nielson, 1983
2. Hikangia Nielson, 1983

Macroceratogoniini Kirkaldy, 1906

monogeneric - Australia

1. Macroceratogonia Kirkaldy, 1906

Sandersellini DeLong, 1945

monogeneric - S. America

1. Sandersellus DeLong, 1945

=== Teruliini ===
Authority: Nielson, 1979

1. Amylidia Nielson, 1983
2. Articoelidia Nielson, 1979
3. Baluba Nielson, 1979
4. Barodecus Nielson, 1979
5. Biadorus Nielson, 1979
6. Bolidiana Nielson, 1979
7. Brevicapitorus Nielson, 1989
8. Carinolidia Nielson, 1979
9. Cochanga Nielson, 1979
10. Conbalia Nielson, 1979
11. Corupiana Nielson, 1979
12. Crepluvia Nielson, 1979
13. Derriblocera Nielson, 1983
14. Docalidia Nielson, 1979
15. Freytagolidia Nielson, 2011
16. Genatra Nielson, 1983
17. Harasupia Nielson, 1979
18. Hastalidia Nielson, 1996
19. Inoclapis Nielson, 1979
20. Jalorpa Nielson, 1979
21. Jawigia Nielson, 1979
22. Jikradia Nielson, 1979
23. Kalimorpha Nielson, 1979
24. Korsigianus Nielson, 1979
25. Kravilidius Nielson, 1979
26. Labocurtidia Nielson, 1979
27. Laevilidia Nielson, 1979
28. Larsenolidia Nielson, 1996
29. Licolidia Nielson, 1979
30. Licontinia Nielson, 1979
31. Loretolidia Nielson & Lozada, 2015
32. Marcapatiana Nielson, 1979
33. Mexolidia Nielson, 1983
34. Neodocalidia Nielson, 2011
35. Noritonus Nielson, 1979
36. Onblavia Nielson, 1979
37. Panolidia Nielson, 1979
38. Paracarinolidia Nielson, 1979
39. Paraterulia Nielson, 1979
40. Peayanus Nielson, 1979
41. Perspinolidia Nielson, 1989
42. Perulidia Nielson, 1979
43. Plapigella Nielson, 1979
44. Racinolidia Nielson, 1983
45. Sapingia Nielson, 1979
46. Scapidonus Nielson, 1983
47. Spanigorlus Nielson, 1979
48. Sprundigia Nielson, 1979
49. Stalolidia Nielson, 1979
50. Terulia Stål, 1862
51. Vernobia Nielson, 1979
52. Yochlia Nielson, 1979

=== Thagriini ===
Authority: Distant, 1908 - South, E and SE Asia

1. Tahara (leafhopper) Nielson, 1977
2. Thagria Melichar, 1903

=== Tharrini ===
Authority: Nielson, 1975 - SE Asia to Australia

1. Haranthus Nielson, 1975
2. Neotharra Nielson, 1975
3. Nisitra Walker, 1869

=== Tinobregmini ===
Authority: Oman, 1949 - Americas

1. Chilelana DeLong, 1969
2. Corilidia Nielson, 1982
3. Stenolidia Nielson, 1986
4. Tantulidia Nielson, 1979
5. Tinobregmus Van Duzee, 1894

Youngolidiini Nielson, 1983

1. Afridonus Nielson, 1983
2. Drordana Nielson, 1983
3. Pilosana Nielson, 1983
4. Rikana Nielson, 1983
5. Youngolidia Nielson, 1983
