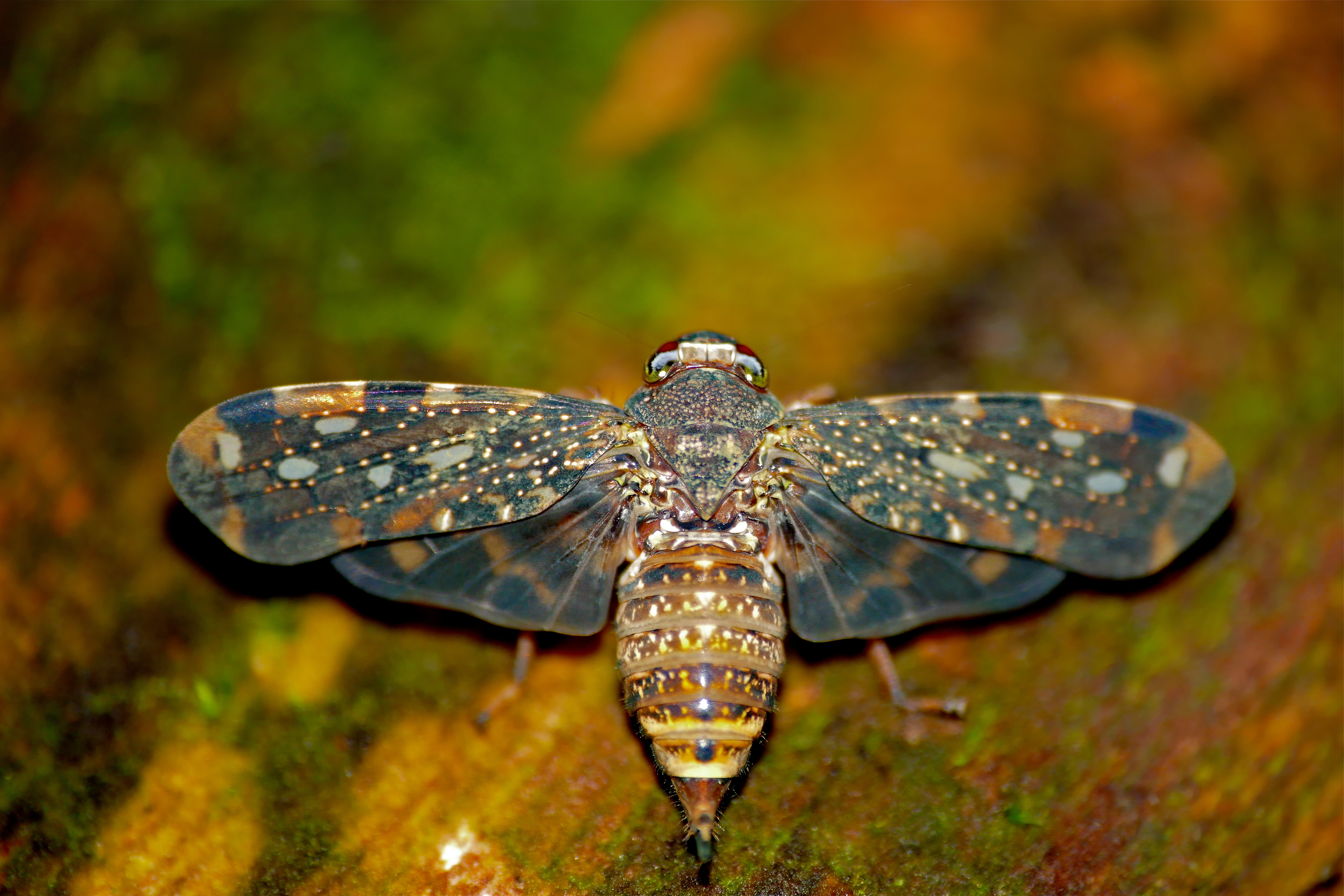
- Thagria sp. showing typical posture

Scientific classification
- Domain: Eukaryota
- Kingdom: Animalia
- Phylum: Arthropoda
- Class: Insecta
- Order: Hemiptera
- Suborder: Auchenorrhyncha
- Family: Cicadellidae
- Tribe: Thagriini
- Genus: Thagria; Melichar, 1903

Type species
- Thagria fasciata Melichar, 1903

= Thagria =

Genus of insects

Thagria is a genus of coelidiine leafhoppers, the largest genus within the subfamily, with most members from the Oriental realm and a few from the Australasian realm. The genus is distinguished by characters of the male genitalia but most of them are known to be colorfully patterned and hold their wings open while resting on leaves.

Nearly 250 species have been described within the genus including:

- T. aciculara Li & Wang, 2002
- T. aculeata Nielson, 1977
- T. acuta Nielson, 1977
- T. aenigmatis Nielson, 2013
- T. alaeva Nielson, 1977
- T. albisigna Walker, 1857
- T. albofascia Fan, Dai & Li, 2013
- T. albonotata Li, 1989
- T. ampla Nielson, 1980
- T. apiculata Xu & Kuoh, 1998
- T. aratra Nielson, 1977
- T. argutata Nielson, 1977
- T. asperitas Nielson, 2013
- T. bakeri Nielson, 1977
- T. barbata Nielson, 1982
- T. beverlyae Nielson, 1977
- T. bidens Nielson, 1977
- T. bidentata Nielson, 1982
- T. bifida Nielson, 1986
- T. bifurcata Nielson, 1982
- T. bigemina Zhang, 1990
- T. bihasta Nielson, 1977
- T. bilata Nielson, 1977
- T. bilateralis Nielson, 1980
- T. biprocessa Fan & Dai, 2015
- T. birama Zhang, 1994
- T. biretrorsa Nielson, 2013
- T. bispina Zhang, 1990
- T. biungulata Nielson, 1977
- T. bivalla Nielson, 1977
- T. blockeri Nielson, 1980
- T. boulardi Nielson, 1980
- T. brevis Nielson, 1977
- T. brincki Nielson, 1980
- T. brunnea Nielson, 1977
- T. bryani Nielson, 1977
- T. canifascia Walker, 1870
- T. capilla Nielson, 1980
- T. capitata Distant, 1918
- T. captiuncula Nielson, 1977
- T. cardamomi Evans, 1947
- T. carinata Zhang, 1994
- T. caudata Zhang, 1994
- T. checksettsi Nielson, 1992
- T. cheesmanae Nielson, 1977
- T. cincticula Nielson, 1977
- T. circumcincta Jacobi, 1944
- T. colorata Nielson, 2013
- T. conica Zhang, 1990
- T. coniunctionis Nielson, 2013
- T. constanti Nielson, 2013
- T. coonoorensis Distant, 1918
- T. cornicula Nielson, 1977
- T. curvatura Zhang, 1990
- T. curvistyla Li & Wang, 2002
- T. damenglongensis Zhang, 1994
- T. davaoensis Nielson, 1977
- T. decussata Fan & Dai, 2015
- T. dellamayae Nielson, 1977
- T. deltoides Nielson, 1977
- T. denticosta Wang, Li & Dai, 2020
- T. digitata Li, 1989
- T. dirigens Walker, 1857
- T. distanti Nielson, 1977
- T. diversa Walker, 1870
- T. dorothyae Nielson, 1977
- T. elencha Nielson, 1977
- T. elongata Nielson, 1977
- T. elongistyla Nielson, 1977
- T. emeiensis Zhang, 1994
- T. eminentia Nielson, 1977
- T. excavata Nielson, 1992
- T. exilis Nielson, 1977
- T. fabricii Nielson, 1977
- T. fasciata Melichar, 1903
- T. ficta Nielson, 1977
- T. fidelitas Nielson, 2013
- T. fijiana Osborn, 1934
- T. fimbriata Wang, Li & Dai, 2020
- T. fossa Nielson, 1977
- T. fossiata Nielson, 1982
- T. freytagi Nielson, 2013
- T. fryeri Distant, 1918
- T. fucosa Nielson, 1977
- T. fuga Nielson, 1977
- T. furcata Li, 1989
- T. furculata Nielson, 1980
- T. fuscoscuta Zhang, 1994
- T. fuscovenosa Matsumura, 1914
- T. geniculata Li & Wang, 2002
- T. gibba Nielson, 1977
- T. glabra Walker, 1857
- T. gladiiformis Zhang, 1994
- T. gracilis Nielson, 1977
- T. grandis Nielson, 1977
- T. hamata Nielson, 1977
- T. hollowayi Nielson, 1982
- T. hongdoensis Kwon & Lee, 1979
- T. imputata Nielson, 1977
- T. infula Nielson, 1977
- T. inscripta Walker, 1870
- T. insolentis Nielson, 1986
- T. intorta Nielson, 2013
- T. introducta Distant, 1908
- T. irregularis Fan & Dai, 2015
- T. iuxta Nielson, 2013
- T. janssoni Nielson, 1977
- T. jinia Zhang, 1994
- T. kaloostiani Nielson, 1980
- T. kammi Nielson, 1977
- T. krameri Nielson, 1977
- T. kronestedti Nielson, 1977
- T. lautereri Nielson, 1977
- T. lebes Nielson, 1977
- T. lewisi Nielson, 1977
- T. lisa Zhang & An, 1994
- T. loae Nielson, 1977
- T. lobata Nielson, 2013
- T. longicatilla Nielson, 2013
- T. louisae Nielson, 1977
- T. lurida Melichar, 1903
- T. luteifascia Walker, 1870
- T. luzonensis Baker, 1915
- T. malenovskyi Nielson, 2013
- T. mamma Nielson, 1977
- T. marcida Nielson, 1977
- T. marilynae Nielson, 1977
- T. marissae Nielson, 1986
- T. marlenae Nielson, 1977
- T. matsumurai Nielson, 1977
- T. melichari Nielson, 1986
- T. menglana Wang & Zhang, 2017
- T. minuta Nielson, 1977
- T. morosa Nielson, 1977
- T. multicalcara Nielson, 1977
- T. multipars Walker, 1858
- T. multispiculata Nielson, 1977
- T. multispinosa Fan & Dai, 2015
- T. mutabilis Nielson, 1982
- T. normani Nielson, 1977
- T. obrienae Nielson, 1977
- T. ochripes Spångberg, 1878
- T. oldfieldi Nielson, 2013
- T. ornata Nielson, 1977
- T. pala Nielson, 1977
- T. paradigitata Nielson, 1980
- T. paraexilis Nielson, 1980
- T. paraloae Nielson, 1980
- T. paramultipars Fan & Li, 2015
- T. paraornata Nielson, 1980
- T. paraunca Nielson, 2013
- T. pardalis Walker, 1857
- T. patriciae Nielson, 1977
- T. patruelis Nielson, 1977
- T. peayi Nielson, 1977
- T. pega Zhang, 1990
- T. peravis Nielson, 1977
- T. periserrula Zhang, 1994
- T. perspicuata Nielson, 1977
- T. philagroides Jacobi, 1914
- T. philippina Stål, 1870
- T. picea Walker, 1870
- T. projecta Distant, 1908
- T. pulchella Kirby, 1891
- T. quadrilancea Nielson, 1977
- T. quadrimaculata Nielson, 2013
- T. quadrispinosa Nielson, 2013
- T. quintata Nielson, 1977
- T. referta Nielson, 1977
- T. retrorsa Nielson, 1982
- T. rima Nielson, 1977
- T. rorata Distant, 1908
- T. rugosa Nielson, 1977
- T. rutata Distant, 1908
- T. sagittata Nielson, 1977
- T. samuelsoni Nielson, 1980
- T. sandakanensis Nielson, 1977
- T. sarawakensis Nielson, 1977
- T. sarcula Nielson, 1977
- T. serrastyla Nielson, 1980
- T. serrata Nielson, 1977
- T. signata Distant, 1908
- T. similis Nielson, 1977
- T. simulata Distant, 1908
- T. singularis Nielson, 1977
- T. sola Nielson, 1977
- T. soosi Nielson, 1977
- T. srilankensis Nielson, 1980
- T. stali Nielson, 1977
- T. sticta Zhang, 1994
- T. subnotata Walker, 1870
- T. sulphurea Distant, 1908
- T. tenasserimensis Distant, 1908
- T. thailandensis Nielson, 1980
- T. tingeyi Nielson, 1977
- T. tintinnabula Nielson, 1977
- T. tragulae Nielson, 1977
- T. triangula Fan & Li, 2015
- T. tridactyla Zhang, 1994
- T. tridentia Nielson, 1977
- T. triementia Nielson, 1977
- T. trifasciata Fan & Li, 2015
- T. trifida Cai & Kuoh, 1995
- T. trifurcata Wang, Li & Dai, 2020
- T. trimaculata Nielson, 2013
- T. trulla Nielson, 1977
- T. tuxeni Nielson, 1977
- T. unca Nielson, 1977
- T. uncinata Zhang, 1994
- T. undulata Nielson, 1980
- T. ungulata Nielson, 1977
- T. unibasispinosa Nielson, 2013
- T. unica Nielson, 2013
- T. unidentalis Zhang, 1994
- T. unidentata Nielson, 1986
- T. unidigitata Nielson, 1977
- T. vastestyla Wang & Li, 2002
- T. vectigalia Nielson, 1977
- T. ventrocarina Nielson, 1980
- T. ventrorecta Nielson, 1977
- T. verticalis Walker, 1870
- T. vietnamensis Nielson, 1977
- T. viraktamathi Nielson, 2013
- T. virginiae Nielson, 1977
- T. vulgaris Nielson, 1977
- T. walkeri Nielson, 1977
- T. wallacei Nielson, 1977
- T. wangi Zhang, 1994
- T. webbi Fan & Li, 2015
- T. williami Nielson, 1977
- T. xuae Nielson, 2013
- T. zauggi Nielson, 1977
- T. zhengi Zhang & An, 1994
