= Nisitra =

Scientific classification
- Kingdom: Animalia
- Phylum: Arthropoda
- Class: Insecta
- Order: Hemiptera
- Suborder: Auchenorrhyncha
- Family: Cicadellidae
- Subfamily: Coelidiinae
- Tribe: Tharrini
- Genus: Nisitra; Walker, 1869

Synonyms
- Jassoidula Osborn, 1934; Muirella Kirkaldy, 1907; Nisitrana Metcalf, 1952; Tharra Kirkaldy, 1906

Genus of true bugs

External image
- Image of new sp. (2025: Belgian Journal of Entomology)

Nisitra is a genus of Asian leafhoppers in the subfamily Coelidiinae and tribe Tharrini, erected by Francis Walker in 1869. Species have been recorded from Indochina, Malesia, through to eastern Australia.

== Species ==
The World Auchenorrhyncha Database includes:

1. Nisitra acusifera (Nielson, 1975)
2. Nisitra angusta (Nielson, 1982)
3. Nisitra arca (Nielson, 1975)
4. Nisitra asolita (Nielson, 1975)
5. Nisitra aurulenta (Walker, 1869)
6. Nisitra biclades (Nielson, 1975)
7. Nisitra bicornipes (Nielson, 1975)
8. Nisitra bidentis (Nielson, 1975)
9. Nisitra bimaculata (Nielson, 1975)
10. Nisitra bispiculata (Nielson, 1975)
11. Nisitra borneoensis (Nielson, 1975)
12. Nisitra bucina (Nielson, 1992)
13. Nisitra caledoniensis (Nielson, 1975)
14. Nisitra ciliata (Nielson, 1982)
15. Nisitra coacta (Nielson, 1975)
16. Nisitra constricta (Nielson, 1975)
17. Nisitra costata (Nielson, 1975)
18. Nisitra crenulata (Nielson, 1975)
19. Nisitra curtisi (Nielson, 1975)
20. Nisitra danae (Nielson, 1975)
21. Nisitra doni (Nielson, 1975)
22. Nisitra dorsimacula (Walker, 1869)
23. Nisitra emilyae (Nielson, 1992)
24. Nisitra epidentata (Nielson, 1982)
25. Nisitra evansi (Nielson, 1975)
26. Nisitra flamma (Nielson, 1975)
27. Nisitra flavocosta (Nielson, 1975)
28. Nisitra flavomaculata (Metcalf, 1950)
29. Nisitra forissa (Nielson, 1975)
30. Nisitra frontalis (Nielson, 1975)
31. Nisitra gladia (Nielson, 1975)
32. Nisitra grandis (Nielson, 1975)
33. Nisitra gressitti (Nielson, 1975)
34. Nisitra hackeri (Evans, 1966)
35. Nisitra hades (Linnavuori, 1960)
36. Nisitra hamata (Nielson, 1982)
37. Nisitra hammeri (Nielson, 1982)
38. Nisitra hebridensis (Nielson, 1975)
39. Nisitra insoluta (Nielson, 1975)
40. Nisitra kalypso (Kirkaldy, 1907)
41. Nisitra kassiphone (Kirkaldy, 1907)
42. Nisitra kirkaldyi (Linnavuori, 1960)
43. Nisitra knighti (Nielson, 1975)
44. Nisitra kraussi (Nielson, 1975)
45. Nisitra labena (Kirkaldy, 1906)
46. Nisitra lamma (Nielson, 1975)
47. Nisitra lanceolata (Nielson, 1982)
48. Nisitra leai (Evans, 1941)
49. Nisitra lenta (Nielson, 1975)
50. Nisitra leucomelana (Walker, 1869)
51. Nisitra limbata (Osborn, 1934)
52. Nisitra lineata (Nielson, 1975)
53. Nisitra lutea (Montrouzier, 1861)
54. Nisitra maai (Nielson, 1975)
55. Nisitra maculiceps (Walker, 1869)
56. Nisitra marlatti (Nielson, 1975)
57. Nisitra metallica (Osborn, 1934)
58. Nisitra nakatai (Nielson, 1975)
59. Nisitra nausikaa (Kirkaldy, 1907)
60. Nisitra nausikoides (Linnavuori, 1960)
61. Nisitra nigroides (Nielson, 1975)
62. Nisitra nitida (Nielson, 1975)
63. Nisitra ocellata (Metcalf, 1946)
64. Nisitra ochracea (Osborn, 1934)
65. Nisitra ogygia (Kirkaldy, 1907)
66. Nisitra oxyomma (Kirkaldy, 1907)
67. Nisitra papuaensis (Nielson, 1975)
68. Nisitra pectoides (Nielson, 1975)
69. Nisitra perbrevis (Nielson, 1975)
70. Nisitra perlucida (Nielson, 1975)
71. Nisitra permagna (Nielson, 1975)
72. Nisitra phongdienensis Semeraro, Constant & Pham, 2025
73. Nisitra picta (Montrouzier, 1861)
74. Nisitra pustula (Nielson, 1975)
75. Nisitra quadrifida (Nielson, 1975)
76. Nisitra robusta (Nielson, 1975)
77. Nisitra rufivena (Walker, 1869)
78. Nisitra sarawakensis (Nielson, 1982)
79. Nisitra serrata (Nielson, 1975)
80. Nisitra solomonensis (Nielson, 1975)
81. Nisitra spinulata (Nielson, 1975)
82. Nisitra stabula (Nielson, 1975)
83. Nisitra straminea (Osborn, 1934)
84. Nisitra subapicalis (Walker, 1869)
85. Nisitra subquadrata (Nielson, 1975)
86. Nisitra tahitiensis (Osborn, 1934)
87. Nisitra terminalis (Walker, 1869)
88. Nisitra testacea (Walker, 1869)
89. Nisitra tiarata (Stål, 1865) – type species by subsequent designation of N. telifera Walker, 1869)
90. Nisitra transversa (Nielson, 1975)
91. Nisitra trispinata (Nielson, 1982)
92. Nisitra turrita (Nielson, 1975)
93. Nisitra ventriosa (Nielson, 1975)
94. Nisitra vesca (Nielson, 1975)
95. Nisitra vesculata (Nielson, 1975)
96. Nisitra villicaris (Nielson, 1975)
97. Nisitra villosa (Nielson, 1975)
98. Nisitra vitiensis (Nielson, 1975)
99. Nisitra vittata (Montrouzier, 1861)
