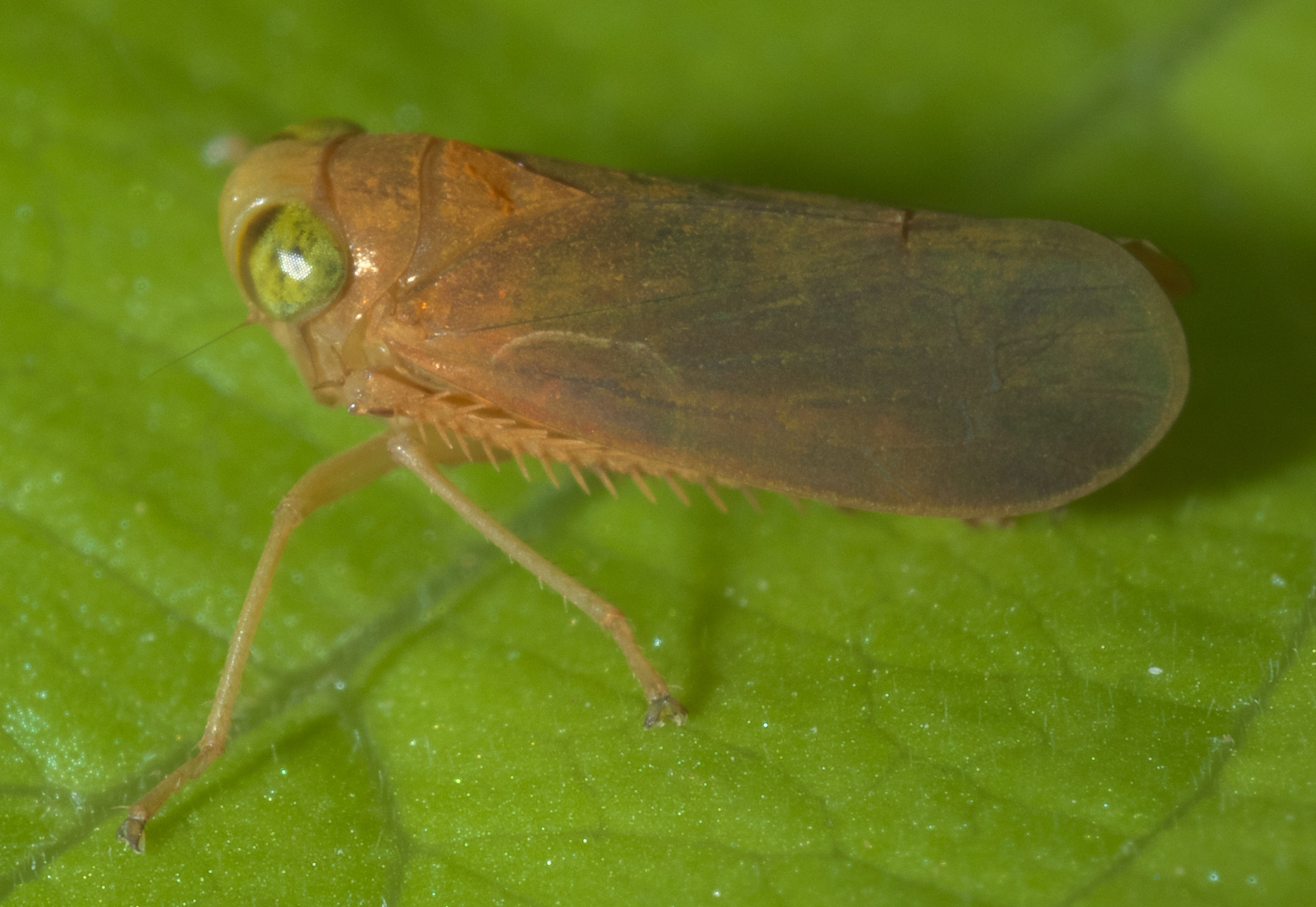
- Jikradia olitoria

Scientific classification
- Kingdom: Animalia
- Phylum: Arthropoda
- Clade: Pancrustacea
- Class: Insecta
- Order: Hemiptera
- Suborder: Auchenorrhyncha
- Family: Cicadellidae
- Subfamily: Coelidiinae
- Tribe: Teruliini
- Genus: Jikradia; Nielson, 1979

= Jikradia =

Genus of leafhoppers

Jikradia is a genus of Palaearctic and Nearctic leafhoppers (family Cicadellidae). There are over 20 described species in Jikradia.

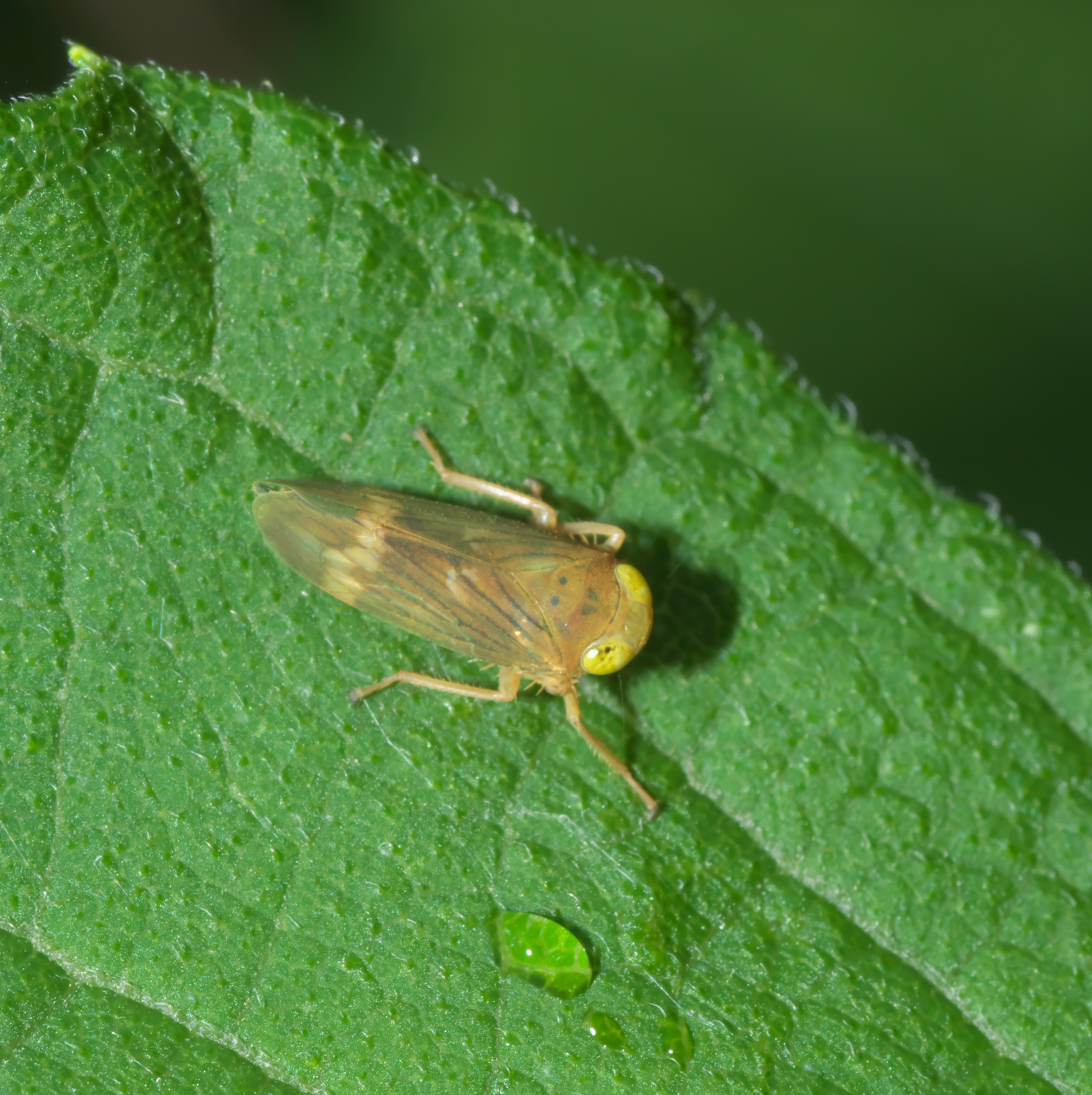
Jikradia olitoria

== Species ==
- Jikradia bahamensis Nielson, 1979
- Jikradia basipendula Nielson, 1979
- Jikradia bispinosa Nielson, 1979
- Jikradia cornicula Nielson, 1979
- Jikradia costaricensis Nielson, 1979
- Jikradia dentata Nielson & Zack, 2014
- Jikradia exilis Nielson & Zack, 2014
- Jikradia floridana (Lawson, 1927)
- Jikradia galapagoensis (Osborn, 1924)
- Jikradia infula Nielson, 1989
- Jikradia krameri Nielson, 1979
- Jikradia lizanoi Godoy & Nielson, 1998
- Jikradia longa Godoy & Nielson, 1998
- Jikradia melanotus (Spångberg, 1878)
- Jikradia mexicana Godoy & Nielson, 1998
- Jikradia olitoria (Say, 1830)
- Jikradia serrata Nielson, 1979
- Jikradia trispinata Nielson & Zack, 2014
- Jikradia uniseta Nielson, 1979
- Jikradia variabilis Nielson & Zack, 2014
- Jikradia zurquiensis Godoy & Nielson, 1998
