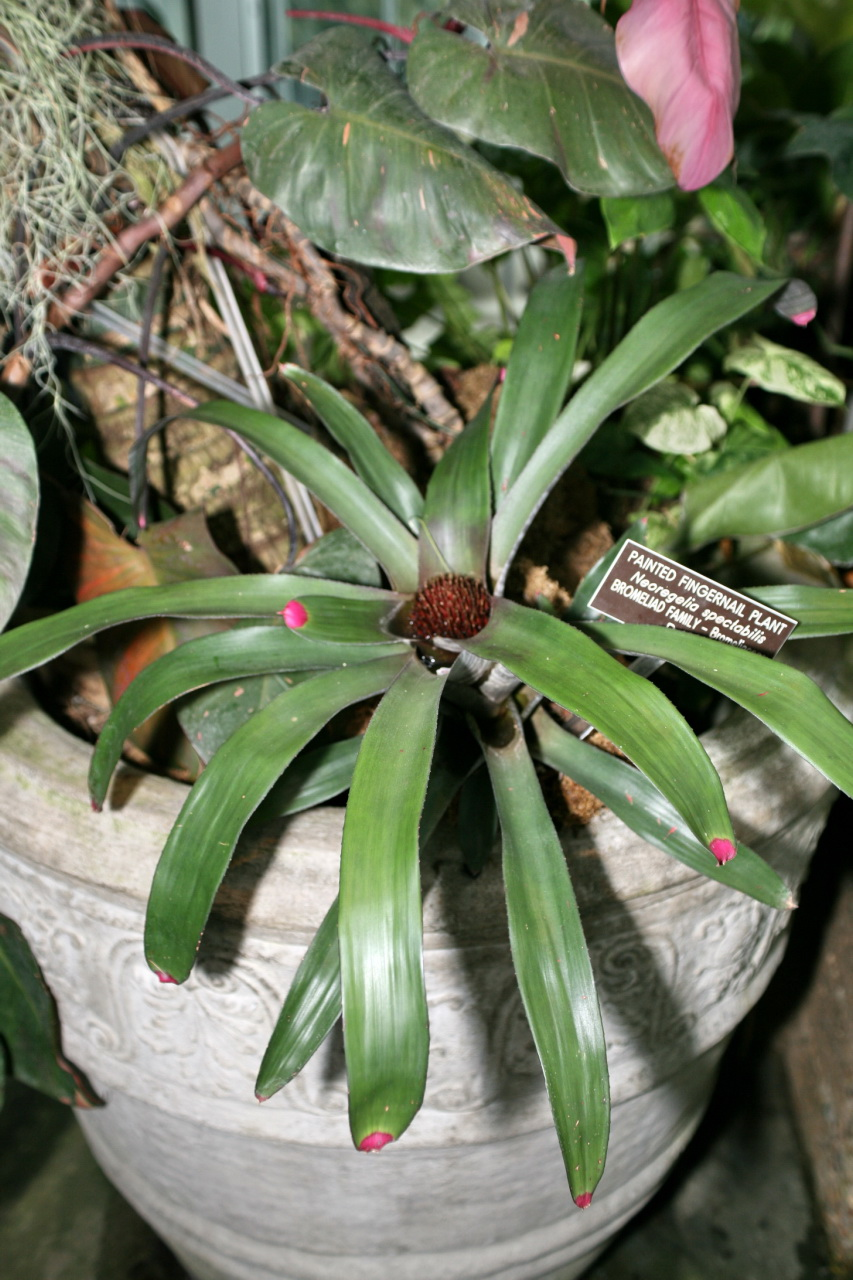

Scientific classification
- Kingdom: Plantae
- Clade: Tracheophytes
- Clade: Angiosperms
- Clade: Monocots
- Clade: Commelinids
- Order: Poales
- Family: Bromeliaceae
- Genus: Neoregelia
- Subgenus: Neoregelia subg. Neoregelia
- Species: N. spectabilis

Binomial name
- Neoregelia spectabilis (Antoine) L.B.Sm.

Synonyms
- Aregelia spectabilis (Antoine) Mez; Karatas spectabilis Antoine; Nidularium spectabile T.Moore; Regelia spectabilis (Antoine) Lindm.; Nidularium eximium Baker

= Neoregelia spectabilis =

Species of flowering plant

Neoregelia spectabilis, the fingernail plant, is a species of flowering plant in the family Bromeliaceae. It is native to the South Brazilian rainforest. Growing to 40 cm (16 in) tall by 80 cm (31 in) wide, it produces rosettes of up to 30 red-tipped strap-shaped leaves, the inner leaves coloured red; and, in summer, blue flowers with red or purple bracts.

The specific epithet spectabilis means showy or spectacular.

With a minimum temperature of 10 °C (50 °F), N. spectabilis is cultivated as a houseplant in temperate regions. It has gained the Royal Horticultural Society's Award of Garden Merit.

== Cultivars ==
- Neoregelia 'Black Knight'
- Neoregelia 'Black Spectabilis'
- Neoregelia 'Bromel-La'
- Neoregelia 'Fiesta'
- Neoregelia 'Inspiration'
- Neoregelia 'Julian Nally'
- Neoregelia 'Lady Racine'
- Neoregelia 'Magenta Dalmatian'
- Neoregelia 'Marcon'
- Neoregelia 'Mary Jo'
- Neoregelia 'Nice Surprise'
- Neoregelia 'Pinkie'
- Neoregelia 'Pinstripe'
- Neoregelia 'Red On Green'
- Neoregelia 'Sincerely'
- Neoregelia 'Spectaline'
- Neoregelia 'Spectaroan'
- Neoregelia 'Spotted Imp'
- Neoregelia 'Thunderball'
- × Neobergia 'Perneri'
- × Neomea 'Pink Cascade'
- × Neotanthus 'Charlien Rose'
- × Neotanthus 'Tom Montgomery'
- × Niduregelia 'Sunset'
