= N. nivea =

N. nivea may refer to:

- Naja nivea, the Cape cobra or yellow cobra, a venomous snake species
- Neoregelia nivea, a plant species native to Brazil
- Notholaena nivea, a synonym for Argyrochosma nivea, an Andean fern species

== See also ==
- Nivea (disambiguation)
