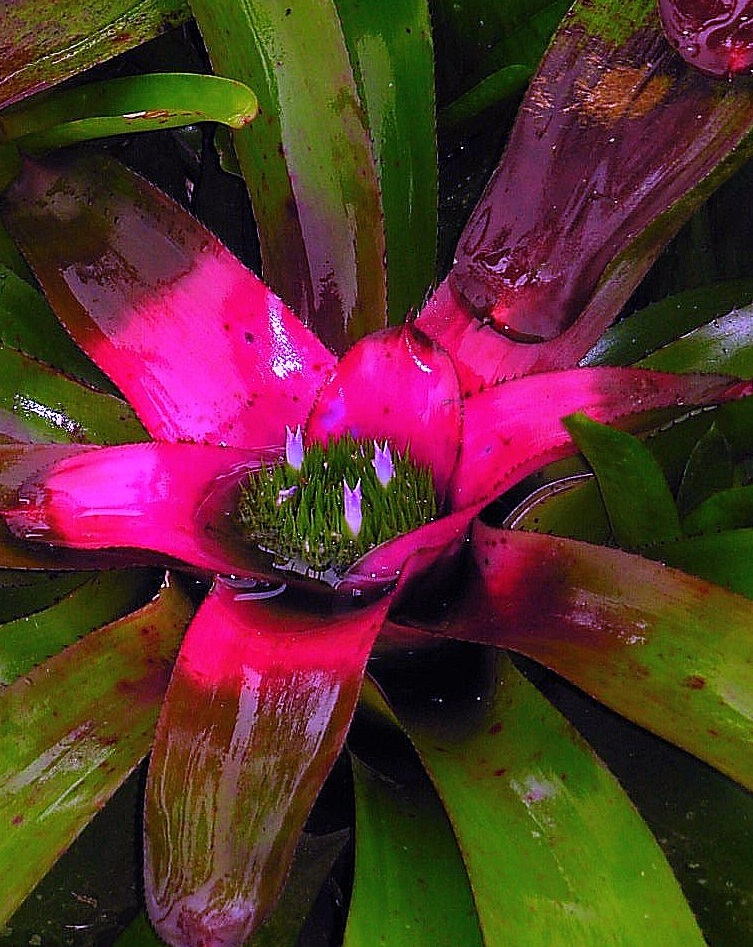

Scientific classification
- Kingdom: Plantae
- Clade: Embryophytes
- Clade: Tracheophytes
- Clade: Spermatophytes
- Clade: Angiosperms
- Clade: Monocots
- Clade: Commelinids
- Order: Poales
- Family: Bromeliaceae
- Genus: Neoregelia
- Subgenus: Neoregelia subg. Neoregelia
- Species: N. coriacea

Binomial name
- Neoregelia coriacea (Antoine) L.B.Sm.

Synonyms
- Aregelia coriacea (Antoine) Mez; Karatas coriacea Antoine; Nidularium coriaceum (Antoine) André; Regelia coriacea (Antoine) Lindm.

= Neoregelia coriacea =

Species of flowering plant

Neoregelia coriacea is a species of flowering plant in the family Bromeliaceae. It is endemic to Brazil.

== Cultivars ==
- Neoregelia 'Night Bird'
- Neoregelia 'Rosy Dawn'
- Neoregelia 'Royal Cordovan'
