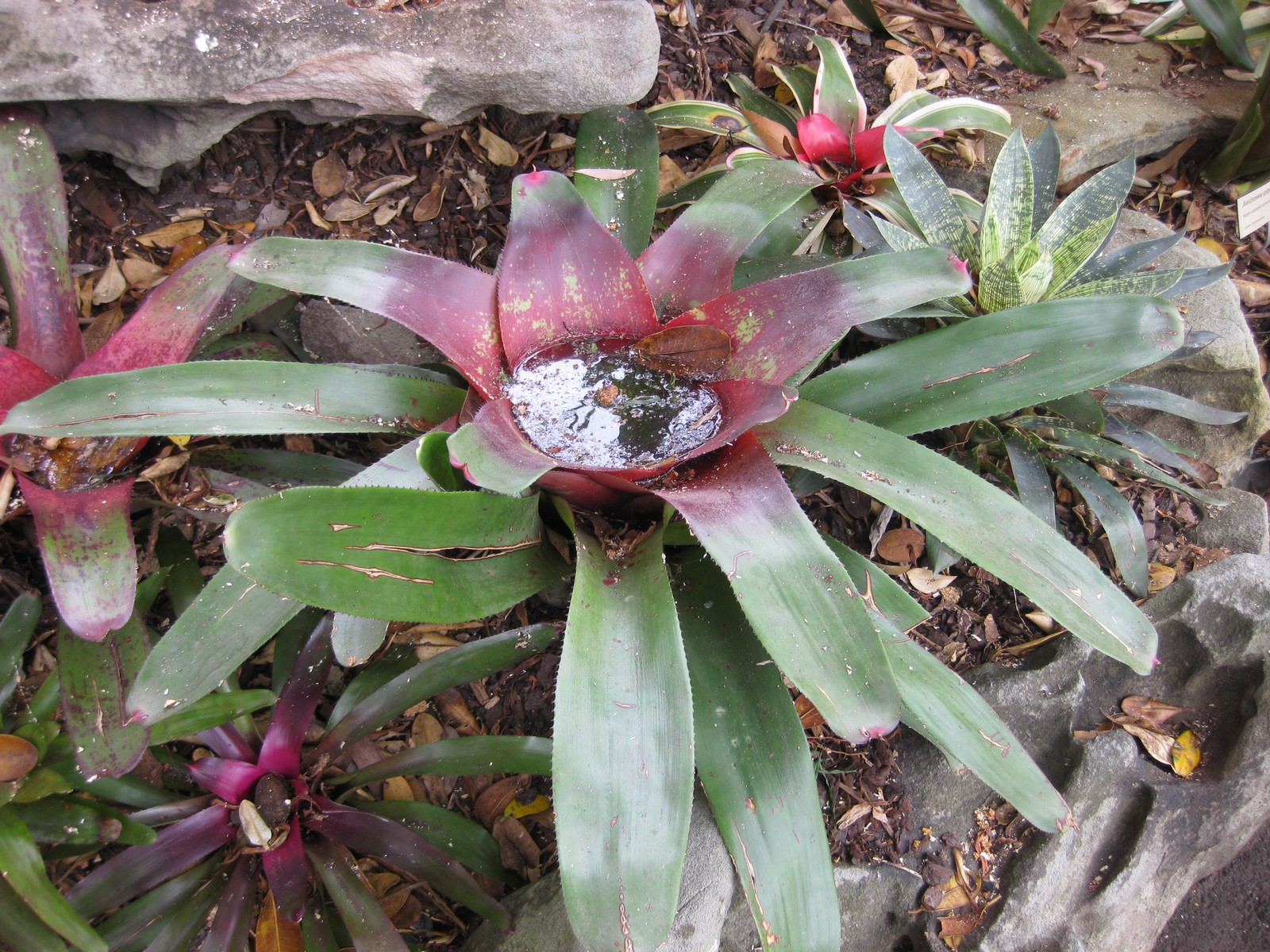

Scientific classification
- Kingdom: Plantae
- Clade: Embryophytes
- Clade: Tracheophytes
- Clade: Spermatophytes
- Clade: Angiosperms
- Clade: Monocots
- Clade: Commelinids
- Order: Poales
- Family: Bromeliaceae
- Genus: Neoregelia
- Subgenus: Neoregelia subg. Neoregelia
- Species: N. magdalenae

Binomial name
- Neoregelia magdalenae L.B.Sm. & Reitz

= Neoregelia magdalenae =

Species of flowering plant

Neoregelia magdalenae is a species of flowering plant in the genus Neoregelia. It is endemic to Brazil.

== Cultivars ==
- Neoregelia 'Crimson Sky'
- Neoregelia 'Crimson Sun'
- Neoregelia 'Cyclops Red'
- Neoregelia 'Nostradamus'
- Neoregelia 'Prophecy'
- Neoregelia 'Sophie'
- Neoregelia 'Star Of Brazil'
