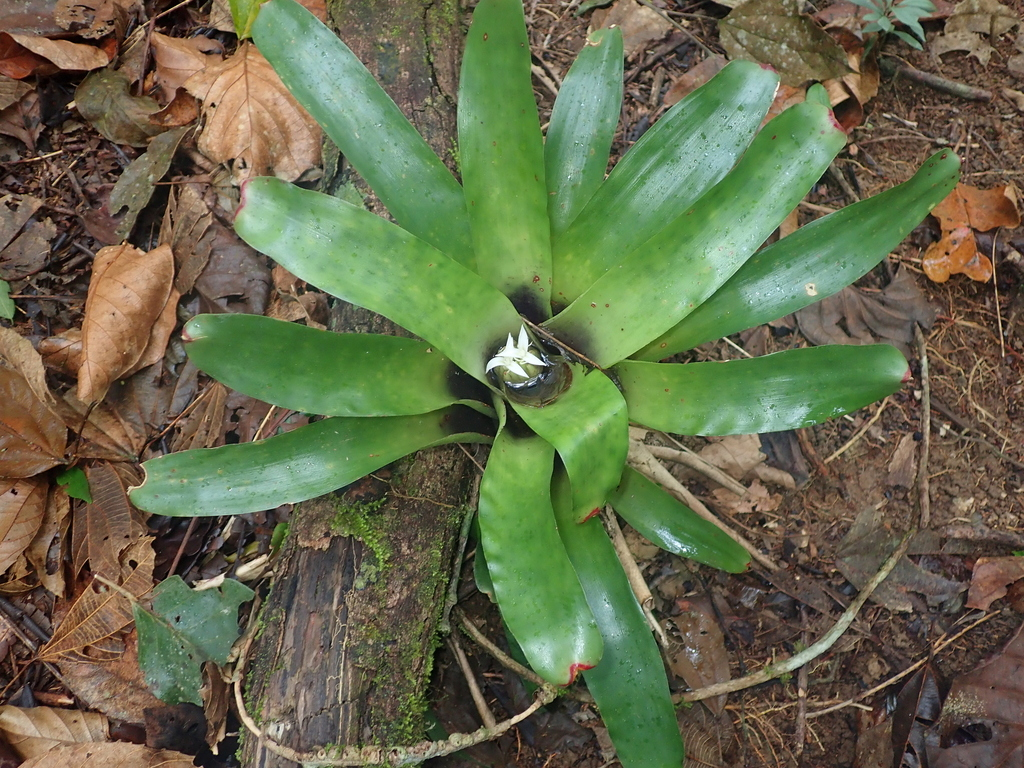

Conservation status
- Least Concern (IUCN 3.1)

Scientific classification
- Kingdom: Plantae
- Clade: Embryophytes
- Clade: Tracheophytes
- Clade: Spermatophytes
- Clade: Angiosperms
- Clade: Monocots
- Clade: Commelinids
- Order: Poales
- Family: Bromeliaceae
- Genus: Neoregelia
- Subgenus: Neoregelia subg. Neoregelia
- Species: N. laevis

Binomial name
- Neoregelia laevis (Mez) L.B.Sm.

Synonyms
- Homotypic Synonyms: Aregelia laevis Mez; Heterotypic Synonyms: Karatas candida Mez; Neoregelia laevis f. maculata H.Luther

= Neoregelia laevis =

Species of flowering plant

Neoregelia laevis is a species of flowering plant in the family Bromeliaceae. It is endemic to Brazil.

== Cultivars ==
- Neoregelia 'Laebee'
- Neoregelia 'Rafael'
- Neoregelia 'Wild Fire'
