= Neoregelia burlemarxii =

Scientific classification
- Kingdom: Plantae
- Clade: Embryophytes
- Clade: Tracheophytes
- Clade: Spermatophytes
- Clade: Angiosperms
- Clade: Monocots
- Clade: Commelinids
- Order: Poales
- Family: Bromeliaceae
- Genus: Neoregelia
- Subgenus: Neoregelia subg. Neoregelia
- Species: N. burlemarxii

Binomial name
- Neoregelia burlemarxii R.W.Read

Species of flowering plant

Neoregelia burlemarxii is a species of flowering plant in the genus Neoregelia. It is endemic to Brazil.

== Cultivars ==
- Neoregelia 'Bob Work'
- Neoregelia 'Firelight'
- Neoregelia 'Grape Expectations'
- Neoregelia 'Margaux'
- Neoregelia 'Miniburl'
- Neoregelia 'Peggy Pollard'
- Neoregelia 'Pokahoo'
- Neoregelia 'Sapphire'
- Neoregelia 'Spring Rain'
