= Neoregelia richteri =

Scientific classification
- Kingdom: Plantae
- Clade: Embryophytes
- Clade: Tracheophytes
- Clade: Spermatophytes
- Clade: Angiosperms
- Clade: Monocots
- Clade: Commelinids
- Order: Poales
- Family: Bromeliaceae
- Genus: Neoregelia
- Subgenus: Neoregelia subg. Neoregelia
- Species: N. richteri

Binomial name
- Neoregelia richteri W.Weber

Species of flowering plant

Neoregelia richteri is a species of flowering plant in the genus Neoregelia. It is native to Brazil.
