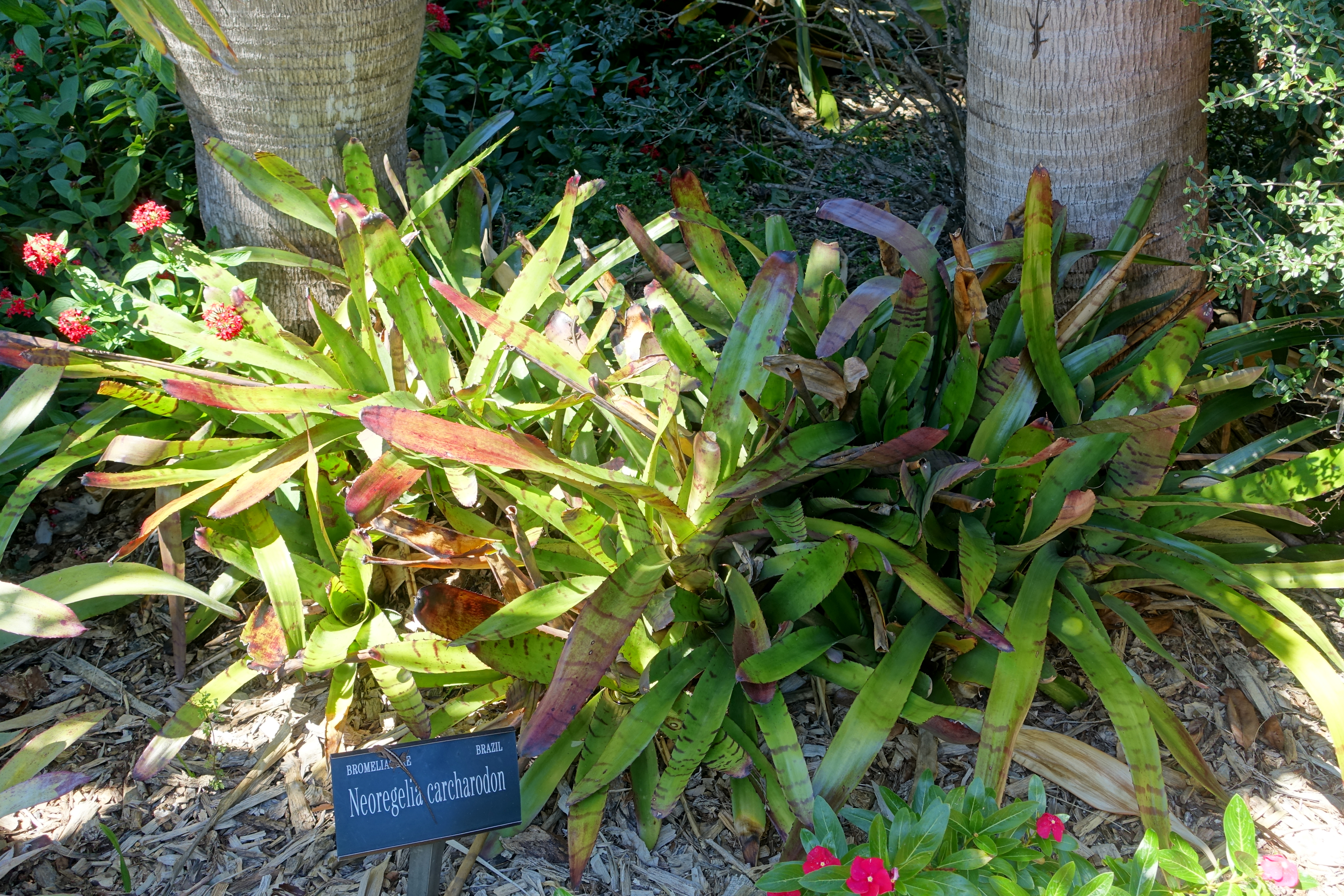

Scientific classification
- Kingdom: Plantae
- Clade: Embryophytes
- Clade: Tracheophytes
- Clade: Spermatophytes
- Clade: Angiosperms
- Clade: Monocots
- Clade: Commelinids
- Order: Poales
- Family: Bromeliaceae
- Genus: Neoregelia
- Subgenus: Neoregelia subg. Neoregelia
- Species: N. carcharodon

Binomial name
- Neoregelia carcharodon (Baker) L.B.Sm.

= Neoregelia carcharodon =

Species of flowering plant

Neoregelia carcharodon is a species of flowering plant in the genus Neoregelia. It is endemic to Brazil.

== Cultivars ==
- Neoregelia 'Arching Star'
- Neoregelia 'Bang'
- Neoregelia 'Big Bang'
- Neoregelia 'Blast Furnace'
- Neoregelia 'Blue Shark'
- Neoregelia 'Bobbie Hull'
- Neoregelia 'Can Can'
- Neoregelia 'Cauldera'
- Neoregelia 'Crater'
- Neoregelia 'Grey Nurse'
- Neoregelia 'Gummy'
- Neoregelia 'Hilda Ariza'
- Neoregelia 'Jaws'
- Neoregelia 'Jaws Too'
- Neoregelia 'Pink on Black'
- Neoregelia 'Raspberry Ripple'
- Neoregelia 'Rouge'
- Neoregelia 'Ruby Frost'
- Neoregelia 'Scarlet Imp'
- Neoregelia 'Triffid'
- Neoregelia 'White Ribbons'
- Neoregelia 'Wobbegong'
- Neoregelia 'Yang'
- Neoregelia 'Yin'
