= Neoregelia longisepala =

Scientific classification
- Kingdom: Plantae
- Clade: Embryophytes
- Clade: Tracheophytes
- Clade: Spermatophytes
- Clade: Angiosperms
- Clade: Monocots
- Clade: Commelinids
- Order: Poales
- Family: Bromeliaceae
- Genus: Neoregelia
- Subgenus: Neoregelia subg. Protoregelia
- Species: N. longisepala

Binomial name
- Neoregelia longisepala E.Pereira & I.A.Penna

Species of flowering plant

Neoregelia longisepala is a species in the genus Neoregelia. It is endemic to Brazil, and is the only species in Neoregelia subgenus Protoregelia.
