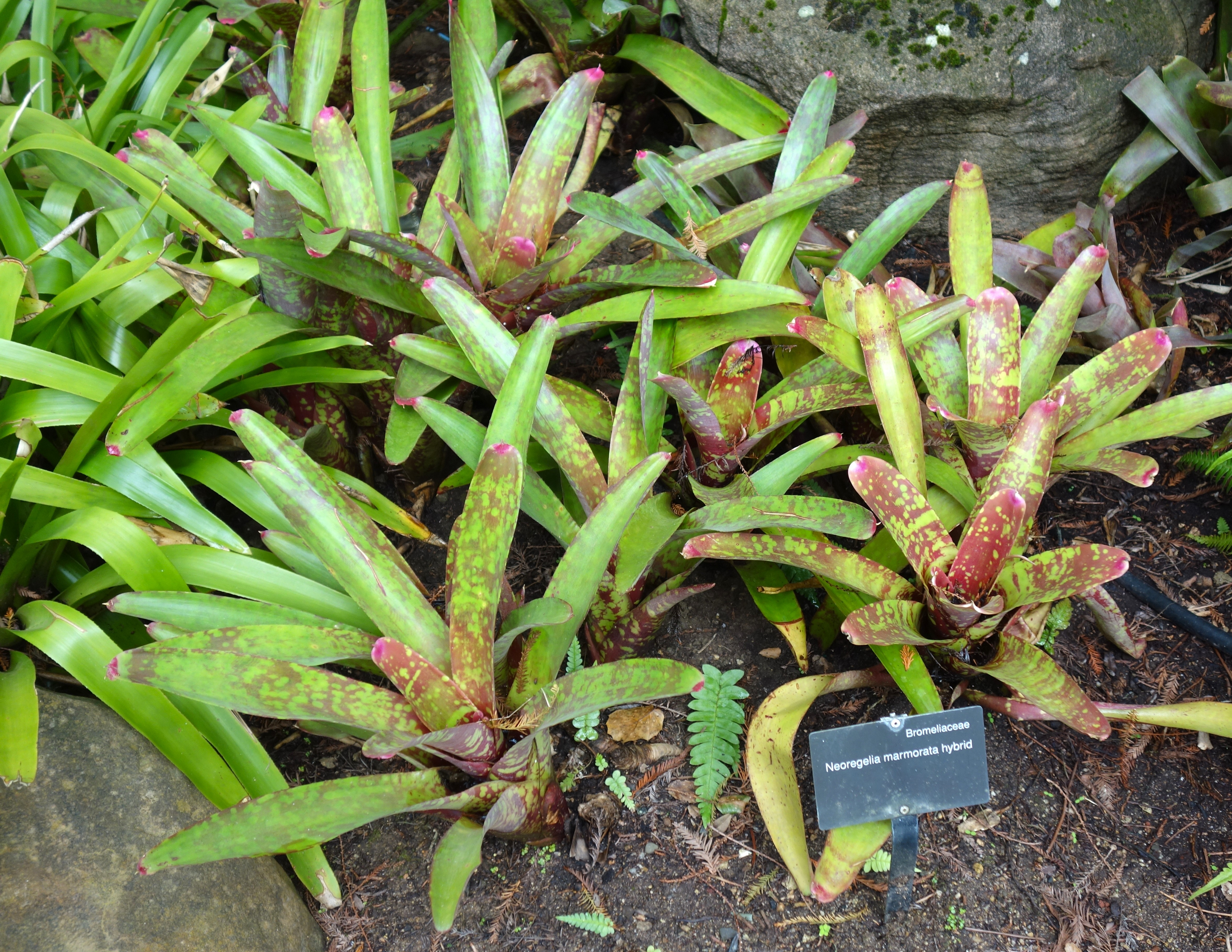

Scientific classification
- Kingdom: Plantae
- Clade: Tracheophytes
- Clade: Angiosperms
- Clade: Monocots
- Clade: Commelinids
- Order: Poales
- Family: Bromeliaceae
- Genus: Neoregelia
- Subgenus: Neoregelia subg. Neoregelia
- Species: N. marmorata

Binomial name
- Neoregelia marmorata (Baker) L.B.Sm.

Synonyms
- Aregelia marmorata (Baker) Mez; Karatas marmorata Baker; Nidularium laurentii var. elatius Regel

= Neoregelia marmorata =

Species of plant

Neoregelia marmorata is a species of flowering plant in the family Bromeliaceae. It is endemic to Brazil.

== Cultivars ==
- Neoregelia 'Alex D. Hawkes'
- Neoregelia 'Atrata'
- Neoregelia 'Beelzebub'
- Neoregelia 'Big Brother'
- Neoregelia 'Bliss'
- Neoregelia 'Charm'
- Neoregelia 'Charmian'
- Neoregelia 'Dad's Special'
- Neoregelia 'Dark Glory'
- Neoregelia 'Dazzle'
- Neoregelia 'Forest Drive'
- Neoregelia 'Freckle Face'
- Neoregelia 'Hal Ellis'
- Neoregelia 'Julian Nally'
- Neoregelia 'Kin-Naree'
- Neoregelia 'Krasny'
- Neoregelia 'Little Cherub'
- Neoregelia 'Madrid'
- Neoregelia 'Manoa Beauty'
- Neoregelia 'Marcon'
- Neoregelia 'Marilu Freckles'
- Neoregelia 'Memoriam'
- Neoregelia 'Mini Misso'
- Neoregelia 'Mottles'
- Neoregelia 'Nez Misso'
- Neoregelia 'Red Clown'
- Neoregelia 'Red Dot'
- Neoregelia 'Red Variety'
- Neoregelia 'Robust'
- Neoregelia 'Rose Mist'
- Neoregelia 'Royal Colour'
- Neoregelia 'Royal Purple'
- Neoregelia 'Royal Red'
- Neoregelia 'Spotted Dick'
- Neoregelia 'Stepping Out'
- Neoregelia 'Stormy Forest'
- Neoregelia 'Stormy Forest Too'
- Neoregelia 'Sun Red'
- Neoregelia 'Suntan'
- Neoregelia 'Sweetie Pie'
- Neoregelia 'Thelma's Choice'
- × Neomea 'Arla Rutledge'
- × Neomea 'San Diego'
- × Neophytum 'Mollie S.'
