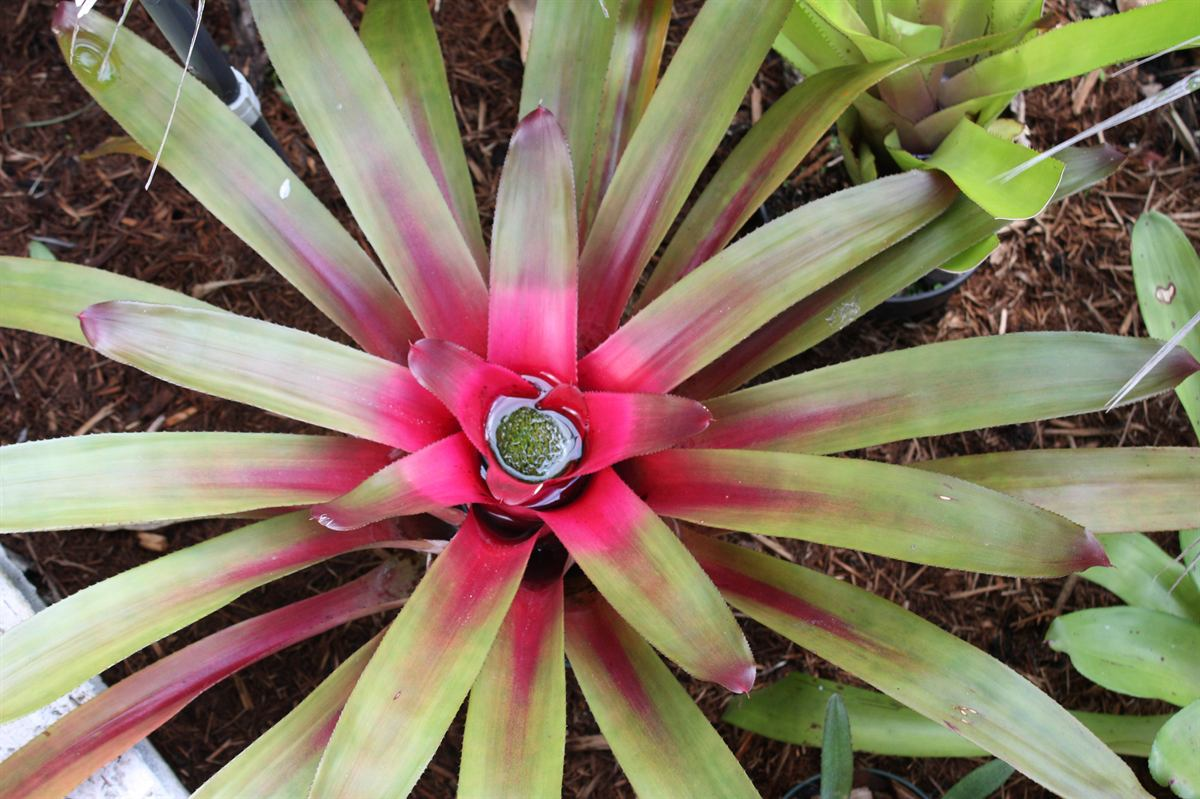

Scientific classification
- Kingdom: Plantae
- Clade: Embryophytes
- Clade: Tracheophytes
- Clade: Spermatophytes
- Clade: Angiosperms
- Clade: Monocots
- Clade: Commelinids
- Order: Poales
- Family: Bromeliaceae
- Genus: Neoregelia
- Subgenus: Neoregelia subg. Neoregelia
- Species: N. sanguinea

Binomial name
- Neoregelia sanguinea Leme

= Neoregelia sanguinea =

Species of flowering plant

Neoregelia sanguinea is a species of flowering plant in the genus Neoregelia. It is endemic to Brazil.

== Cultivars ==
- Neoregelia 'Cat in the Hat'
- Neoregelia 'Kokopelli'
- Neoregelia 'Leopard Eyes'
- Neoregelia 'Phaser'
