= Neoregelia kautskyi =

Scientific classification
- Kingdom: Plantae
- Clade: Embryophytes
- Clade: Tracheophytes
- Clade: Spermatophytes
- Clade: Angiosperms
- Clade: Monocots
- Clade: Commelinids
- Order: Poales
- Family: Bromeliaceae
- Genus: Neoregelia
- Subgenus: Neoregelia subg. Neoregelia
- Species: N. kautskyi

Binomial name
- Neoregelia kautskyi E.Pereira

Species of flowering plant

Neoregelia kautskyi is a species of flowering plant in the genus Neoregelia. It is endemic to Brazil.

== Cultivars ==
- Neoregelia 'Fireside Glow'
- Neoregelia 'Golden Chalice'
- Neoregelia 'Lucky Strike'
- Neoregelia 'Yellow Devil'
