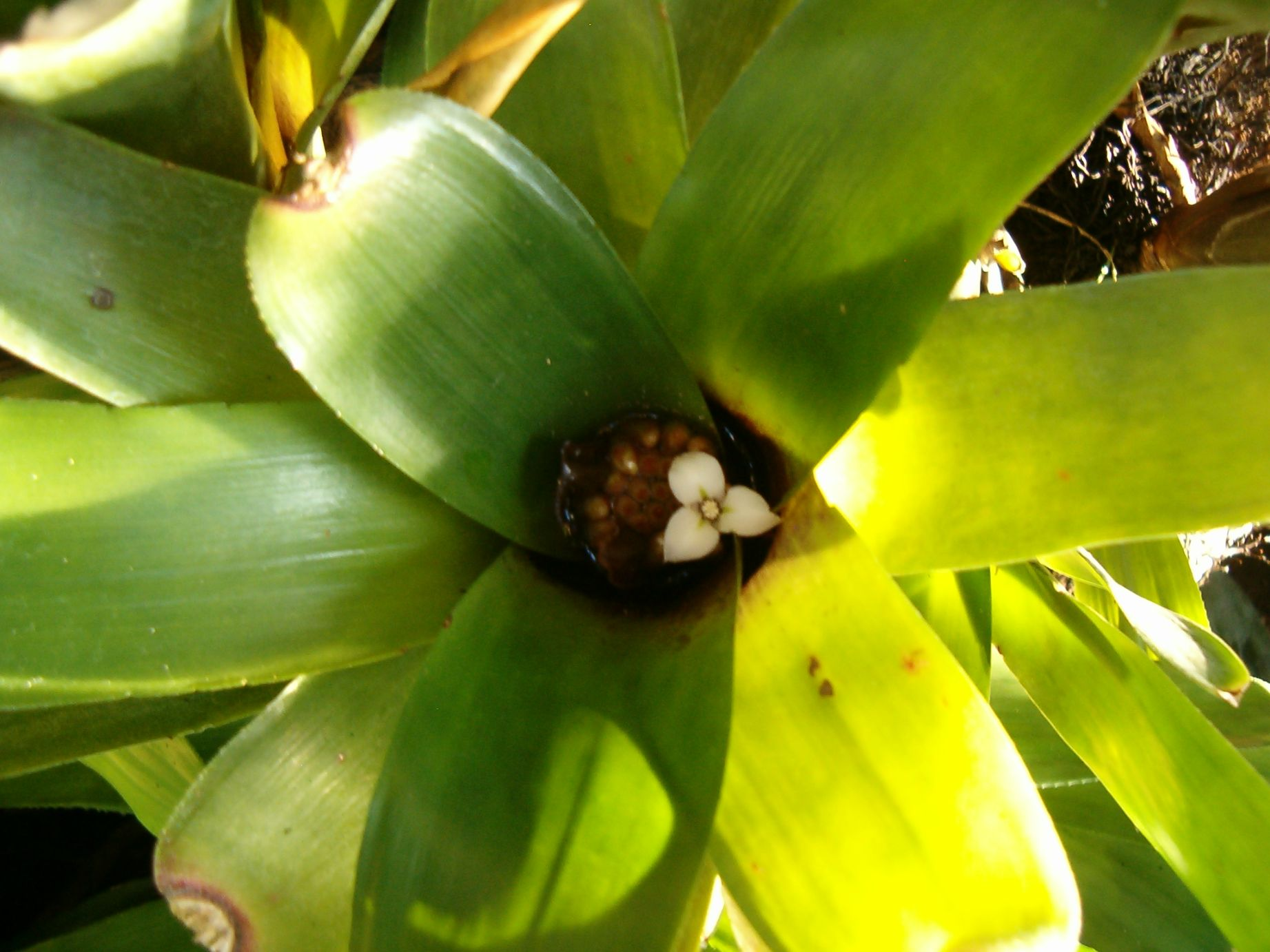

Scientific classification
- Kingdom: Plantae
- Clade: Embryophytes
- Clade: Tracheophytes
- Clade: Spermatophytes
- Clade: Angiosperms
- Clade: Monocots
- Clade: Commelinids
- Order: Poales
- Family: Bromeliaceae
- Genus: Neoregelia
- Subgenus: Neoregelia subg. Neoregelia
- Species: N. sarmentosa

Binomial name
- Neoregelia sarmentosa (Regel) L.B.Sm.

= Neoregelia sarmentosa =

Species of flowering plant

Neoregelia sarmentosa is a species of flowering plant in the genus Neoregelia. It is endemic to Brazil.

== Cultivars ==
- Neoregelia 'Aurora'
- Neoregelia 'Berta'
- Neoregelia 'Crown Fire'
- Neoregelia 'Dolly Bird'
- Neoregelia 'Fall In Love'
- Neoregelia 'Flash Lady'
- Neoregelia 'Frog Prince'
- Neoregelia 'Godsend'
- Neoregelia 'Green Eyes'
- Neoregelia 'Jean Evans'
- Neoregelia 'Kathy'
- Neoregelia 'Maid Of Honour'
- Neoregelia 'Marathon'
- Neoregelia 'Multicolor'
- Neoregelia 'Nana'
- Neoregelia 'Nocturne'
- Neoregelia 'Redneck'
- Neoregelia 'Sara Lee'
- Neoregelia 'Scarlet Star'
- Neoregelia 'Yellow Bird'
