= Neoregelia leucophoea =

Scientific classification
- Kingdom: Plantae
- Clade: Tracheophytes
- Clade: Angiosperms
- Clade: Monocots
- Clade: Commelinids
- Order: Poales
- Family: Bromeliaceae
- Genus: Neoregelia
- Subgenus: Neoregelia subg. Neoregelia
- Species: N. leucophoea

Binomial name
- Neoregelia leucophoea (Baker) L.B.Sm.

Synonyms
- Aregelia leucophaea (Baker) Mez; Karatas leucophoea Baker; Wittrockia leucophoea (Baker) Leme

Species of plant

Neoregelia leucophoea is a species of flowering plant in the Bromeliaceae family. It is endemic to Brazil.
