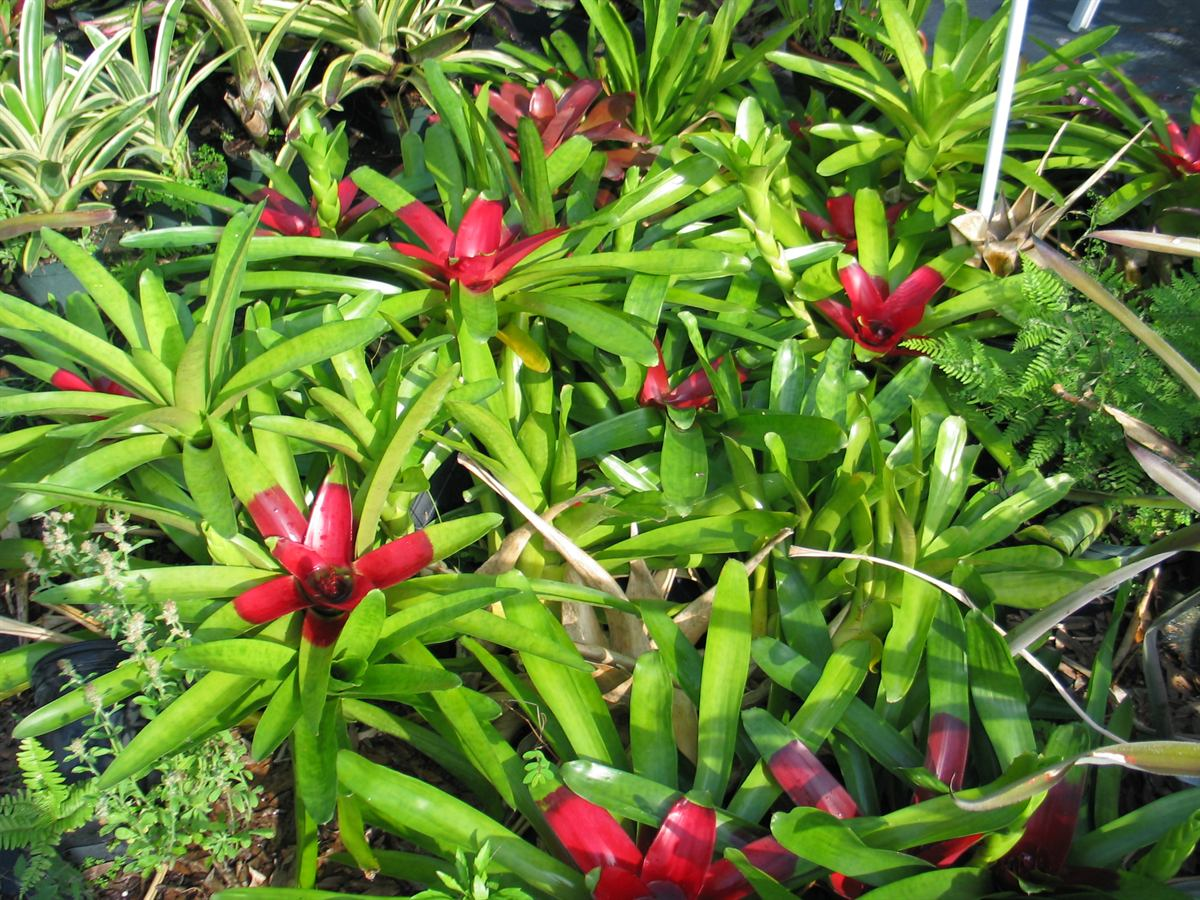

Scientific classification
- Kingdom: Plantae
- Clade: Tracheophytes
- Clade: Angiosperms
- Clade: Monocots
- Clade: Commelinids
- Order: Poales
- Family: Bromeliaceae
- Genus: Neoregelia
- Subgenus: Neoregelia subg. Neoregelia
- Species: N. mcwilliamsii

Binomial name
- Neoregelia mcwilliamsii L.B.Sm.

= Neoregelia mcwilliamsii =

Species of flowering plant

Neoregelia mcwilliamsii is a species of flowering plant in the genus Neoregelia. Its name is also spelt Neoregelia macwilliamsii.

== Cultivars ==
- Neoregelia 'Ivory'
- Neoregelia 'Jeffrey Block'
- Neoregelia 'Liz'
- Neoregelia 'Sassy'
- Neoregelia 'Ultima'
- Neoregelia 'Water Melon'
- Neoregelia 'Zacate'
- × Neomea 'Mundillo'
