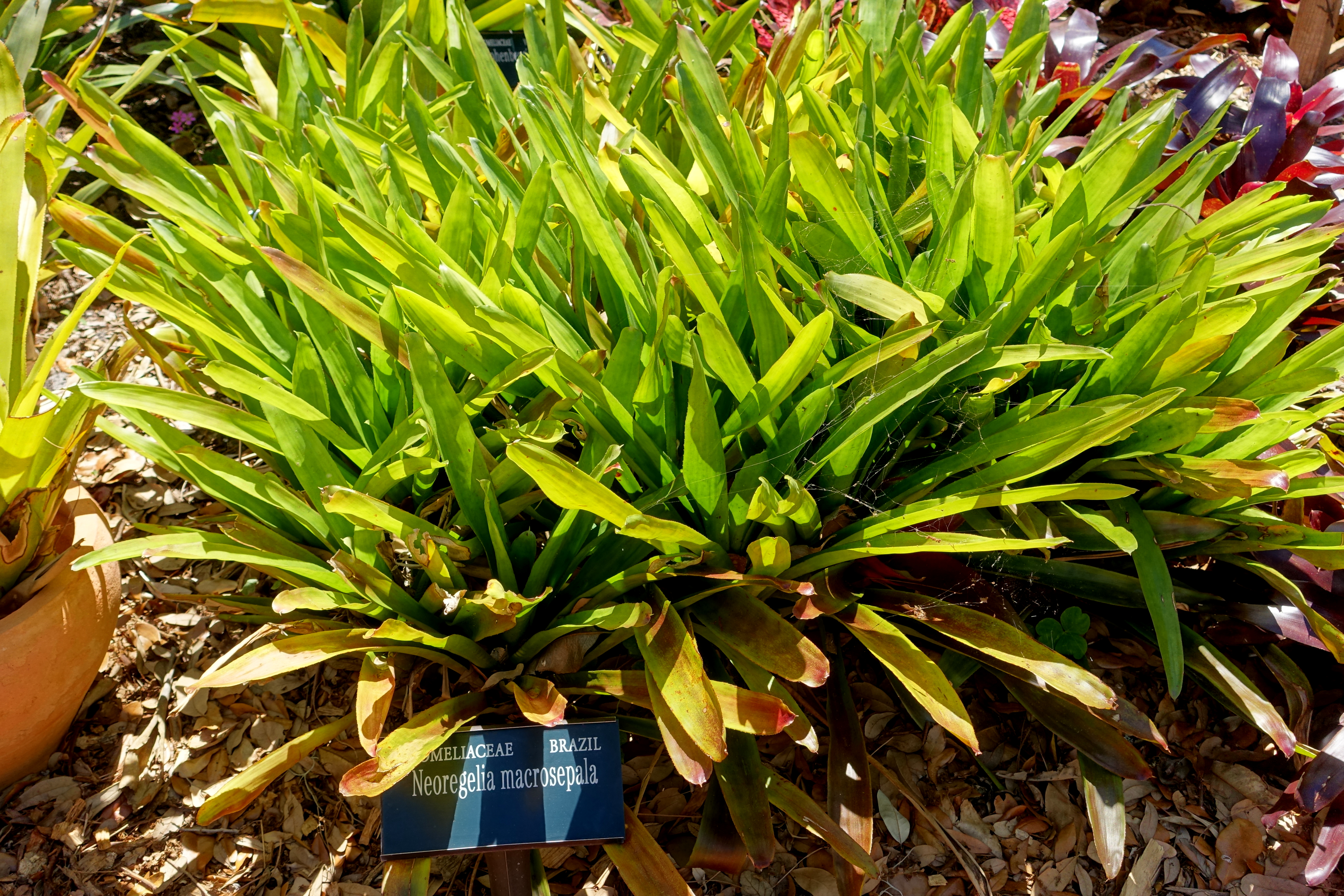

Scientific classification
- Kingdom: Plantae
- Clade: Embryophytes
- Clade: Tracheophytes
- Clade: Spermatophytes
- Clade: Angiosperms
- Clade: Monocots
- Clade: Commelinids
- Order: Poales
- Family: Bromeliaceae
- Genus: Neoregelia
- Subgenus: Neoregelia subg. Neoregelia
- Species: N. macrosepala

Binomial name
- Neoregelia macrosepala L.B.Sm.

= Neoregelia macrosepala =

Species of flowering plant

Neoregelia macrosepala is a species of flowering plant in the genus Neoregelia. It is endemic to Brazil.

== Cultivars ==
- Neoregelia 'Aztec'
- Neoregelia 'El Toro'
- Neoregelia 'Escapade'
- Neoregelia 'Florida Flash'
- Neoregelia 'Gloheart'
- Neoregelia 'Mac Mar'
- Neoregelia 'Malibu'
- Neoregelia 'Pin Cushion'
- Neoregelia 'Pink Freak'
- Neoregelia 'Silver Cloud'
- Neoregelia 'Thelma Hodge'
- Neoregelia 'Wait A While'
- × Niduregelia 'Marechalii'
