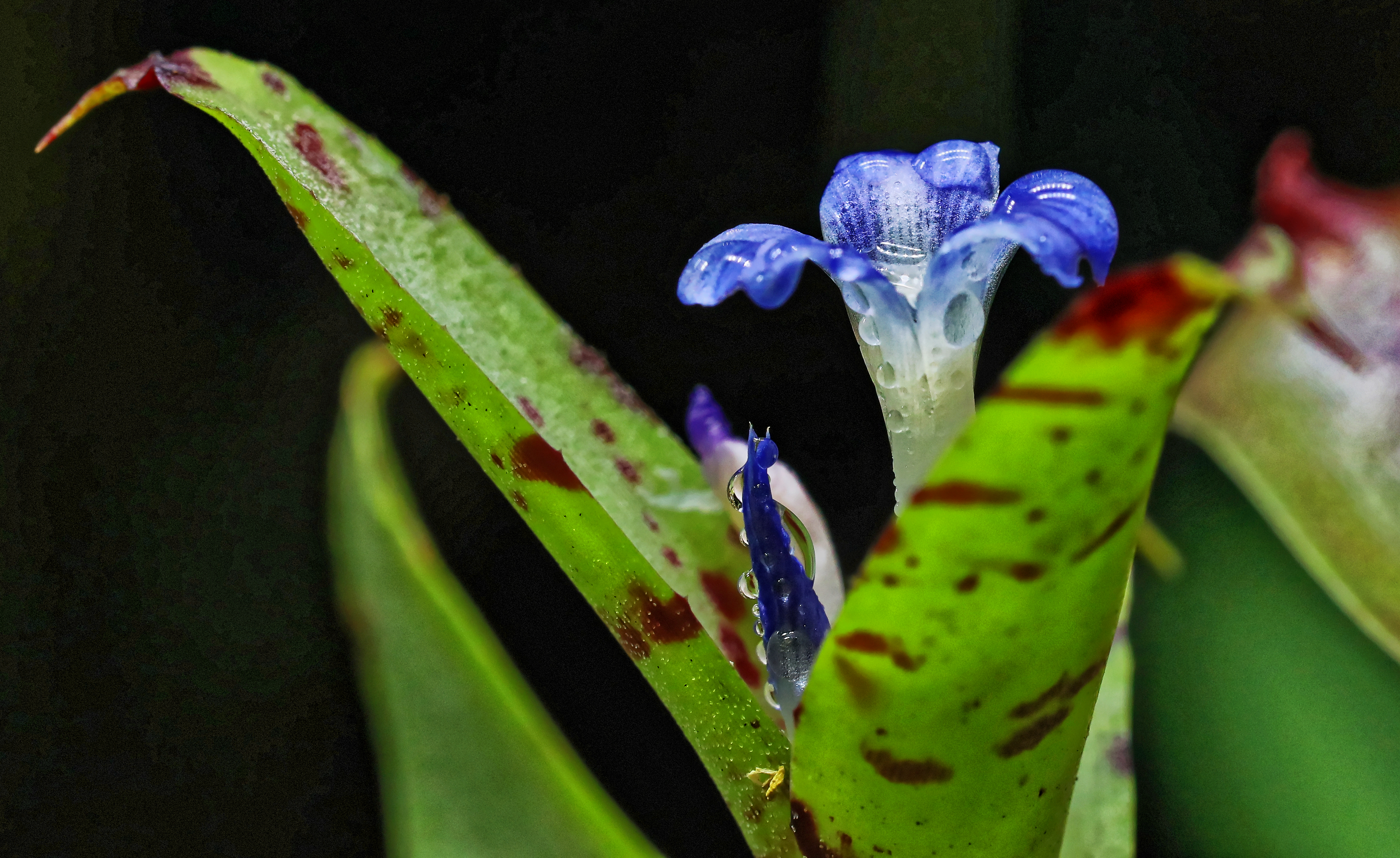

Scientific classification
- Kingdom: Plantae
- Clade: Embryophytes
- Clade: Tracheophytes
- Clade: Spermatophytes
- Clade: Angiosperms
- Clade: Monocots
- Clade: Commelinids
- Order: Poales
- Family: Bromeliaceae
- Genus: Neoregelia
- Subgenus: Neoregelia subg. Neoregelia
- Species: N. lilliputiana

Binomial name
- Neoregelia lilliputiana E.Pereira

= Neoregelia lilliputiana =

Species of flowering plant

Neoregelia lilliputiana is a species of flowering plant in the genus Neoregelia. It is endemic to Brazil.

== Cultivars ==
- Neoregelia 'Bits & Pieces'
- Neoregelia 'Black Devil'
- Neoregelia 'Black Tracker'
- Neoregelia 'Bromanza'
- Neoregelia 'Bromlust'
- Neoregelia 'Cat Nap'
- Neoregelia 'Chiquita Linda'
- Neoregelia 'Cougar'
- Neoregelia 'Dark Mood'
- Neoregelia 'Dolly'
- Neoregelia 'Felix'
- Neoregelia 'Flare Up'
- Neoregelia 'Gene McKenzie'
- Neoregelia 'Gold Pass'
- Neoregelia 'Gold Pass Too'
- Neoregelia 'Grace's Avalanche'
- Neoregelia 'Grace's Candelabra'
- Neoregelia 'Grace's Focus'
- Neoregelia 'Holly'
- Neoregelia 'Janet Sue'
- Neoregelia 'Jolly'
- Neoregelia 'Lili Marlene'
- Neoregelia 'Lillipet'
- Neoregelia lilliputiana × (carolinae × 'Painted Lady')
- Neoregelia 'Little Jewel'
- Neoregelia 'Little Storm'
- Neoregelia 'Little Tart'
- Neoregelia 'Littlie'
- Neoregelia 'Lullaby'
- Neoregelia 'Millie'
- Neoregelia 'Molly'
- Neoregelia 'Murky Secrets'
- Neoregelia 'Night Spot'
- Neoregelia 'Only Child'
- Neoregelia 'Outrigger'
- Neoregelia 'Pedra do Padre'
- Neoregelia 'Phoebe'
- Neoregelia 'Polly'
- Neoregelia 'Pussy Foot'
- Neoregelia 'Quoll'
- Neoregelia 'Roundabout'
- Neoregelia 'Small Fry'
- Neoregelia 'Spotted Devil'
- Neoregelia 'Tabby'
- Neoregelia 'Tassie Tiger'
- Neoregelia 'Tiger Tim'
- Neoregelia 'Tweedle Dum'
- Neoregelia 'Tweedledee'
- Neoregelia 'Voodoo Magic'
- Neoregelia 'Wicked'
- Neoregelia 'Wild Cat Too'
- Neoregelia 'Willy Nilly'
- Neoregelia 'Witchcraft'
