= Neoregelia punctatissima =

Scientific classification
- Kingdom: Plantae
- Clade: Embryophytes
- Clade: Tracheophytes
- Clade: Spermatophytes
- Clade: Angiosperms
- Clade: Monocots
- Clade: Commelinids
- Order: Poales
- Family: Bromeliaceae
- Genus: Neoregelia
- Subgenus: Neoregelia subg. Neoregelia
- Species: Neoregelia punctatissima

Binomial name
- Neoregelia punctatissima (Ruschi) Ruschi

Species of flowering plant

Neoregelia punctatissima is a species of flowering plant in the genus Neoregelia. It is endemic to Brazil.

== Cultivars ==
- Neoregelia 'Clarise'
- Neoregelia 'Hannibal Lector'
- Neoregelia 'Little Faith'
- Neoregelia 'Moyna Prince'
- Neoregelia 'Natalee Marie'
- Neoregelia 'Sandstorm'
- Neoregelia 'Sparkle'
- Neoregelia 'Sudan'
- Neoregelia 'The Governor's Plea'
- Neoregelia 'Tomfoolery'
- Neoregelia 'Winter Bloom'
