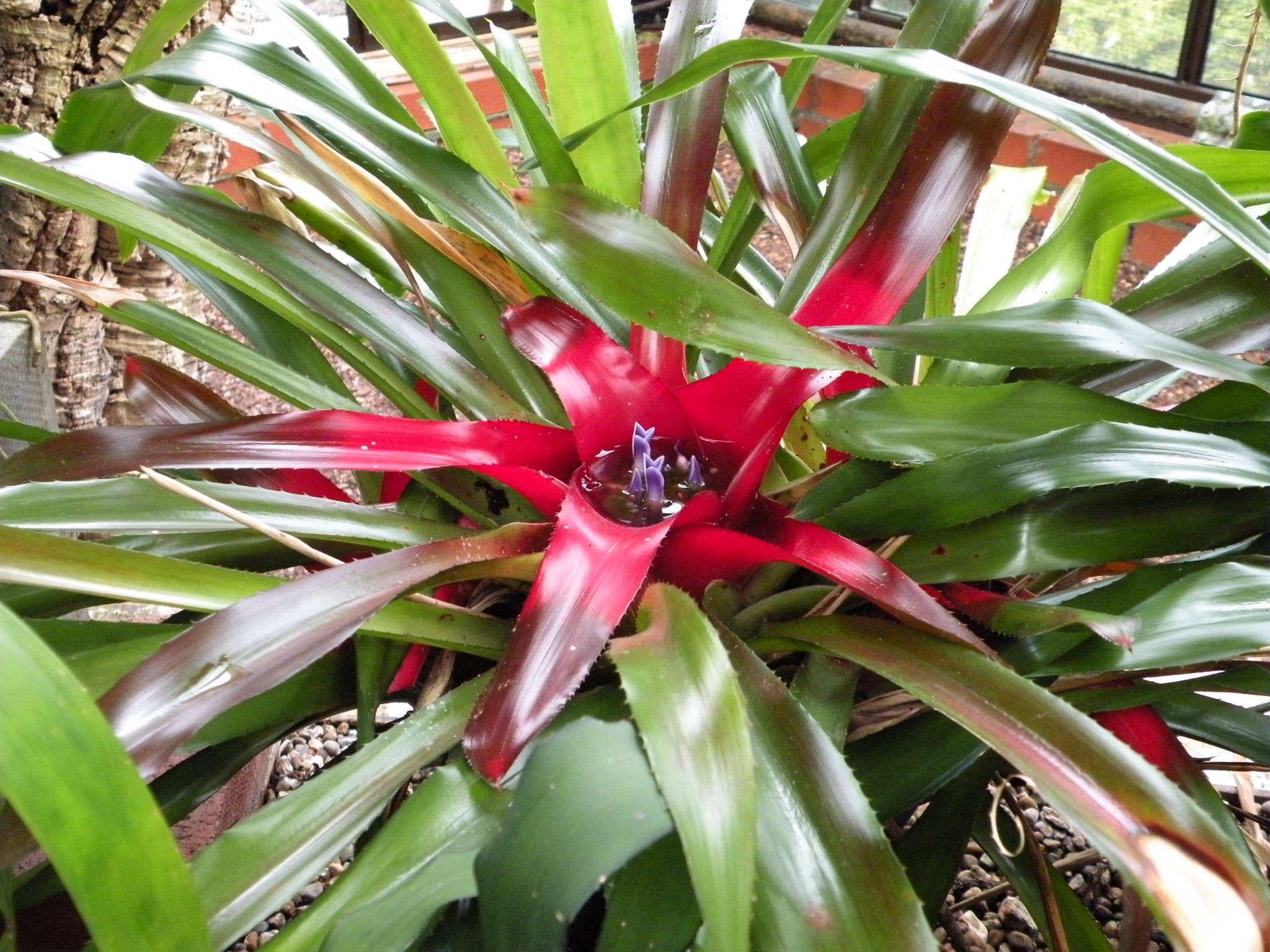

Scientific classification
- Kingdom: Plantae
- Clade: Tracheophytes
- Clade: Angiosperms
- Clade: Monocots
- Clade: Commelinids
- Order: Poales
- Family: Bromeliaceae
- Genus: Neoregelia
- Subgenus: Neoregelia subg. Neoregelia
- Species: N. princeps

Binomial name
- Neoregelia princeps (Baker) L.B.Sm.

Synonyms
- Aregelia marechalii Mez; Aregelia princeps (Baker) Mez; Aregelia princeps var. phyllanthoidea Mez; Karatas princeps Baker; Neoregelia princeps f. phyllanthoidea (Mez) L.B.Sm. Nidularium marechalii Baker; Regelia princeps (Baker) Lindm.

= Neoregelia princeps =

Species of plant

Neoregelia princeps is a species of flowering plant in the family Bromeliaceae. It is native to Brazil.

== Cultivars ==
- Neoregelia 'Bali Hai'
- Neoregelia 'Burning'
- Neoregelia 'Candy Pink'
- Neoregelia 'Cardinal Sin'
- Neoregelia 'Cool Jazz'
- Neoregelia 'Decora'
- Neoregelia 'Deep Regard'
- Neoregelia 'Dreams'
- Neoregelia 'Eddy'
- Neoregelia 'Elegance'
- Neoregelia 'Extravaganza'
- Neoregelia 'Fost Prince'
- Neoregelia 'Granada'
- Neoregelia 'Groovy Ruby'
- Neoregelia 'Insignis'
- Neoregelia 'Jamaica'
- Neoregelia 'Lavender Lovely'
- Neoregelia 'Lepida'
- Neoregelia 'Little Prince'
- Neoregelia 'Marvelous Party'
- Neoregelia 'Nina'
- Neoregelia 'Orchid'
- Neoregelia 'Poppycock'
- Neoregelia 'Prince Fost'
- Neoregelia 'Princely Pink'
- Neoregelia 'Purple Haze'
- Neoregelia 'Purple Paint'
- Neoregelia 'Red Candy Stripe'
- Neoregelia 'Royal Prince'
- Neoregelia 'Secret Heart'
- Neoregelia 'Sincerely'
- Neoregelia 'Sweet Alice'
- Neoregelia 'Syncopate'
- Neoregelia 'Twilight'
- Neoregelia 'Ultimate'
- Neoregelia 'Vanity'
- Neoregelia 'Velvet Blue'
- Neoregelia 'Verna'
- Neoregelia 'Western Prince'
- × Neophytum 'Gary Hendrix'
