= Neoregelia zonata =

Scientific classification
- Kingdom: Plantae
- Clade: Embryophytes
- Clade: Tracheophytes
- Clade: Spermatophytes
- Clade: Angiosperms
- Clade: Monocots
- Clade: Commelinids
- Order: Poales
- Family: Bromeliaceae
- Genus: Neoregelia
- Subgenus: Neoregelia subg. Neoregelia
- Species: N. zonata

Binomial name
- Neoregelia zonata L.B.Sm.

Species of flowering plant

Neoregelia zonata is a species of flowering plant in the genus Neoregelia. It is endemic to Brazil.

== Cultivars ==
- Neoregelia 'Golden Charm'
- Neoregelia 'Piccador'
- Neoregelia 'Red Waves'
- Neoregelia 'Western Sky'
- Neoregelia 'Zodonta'
