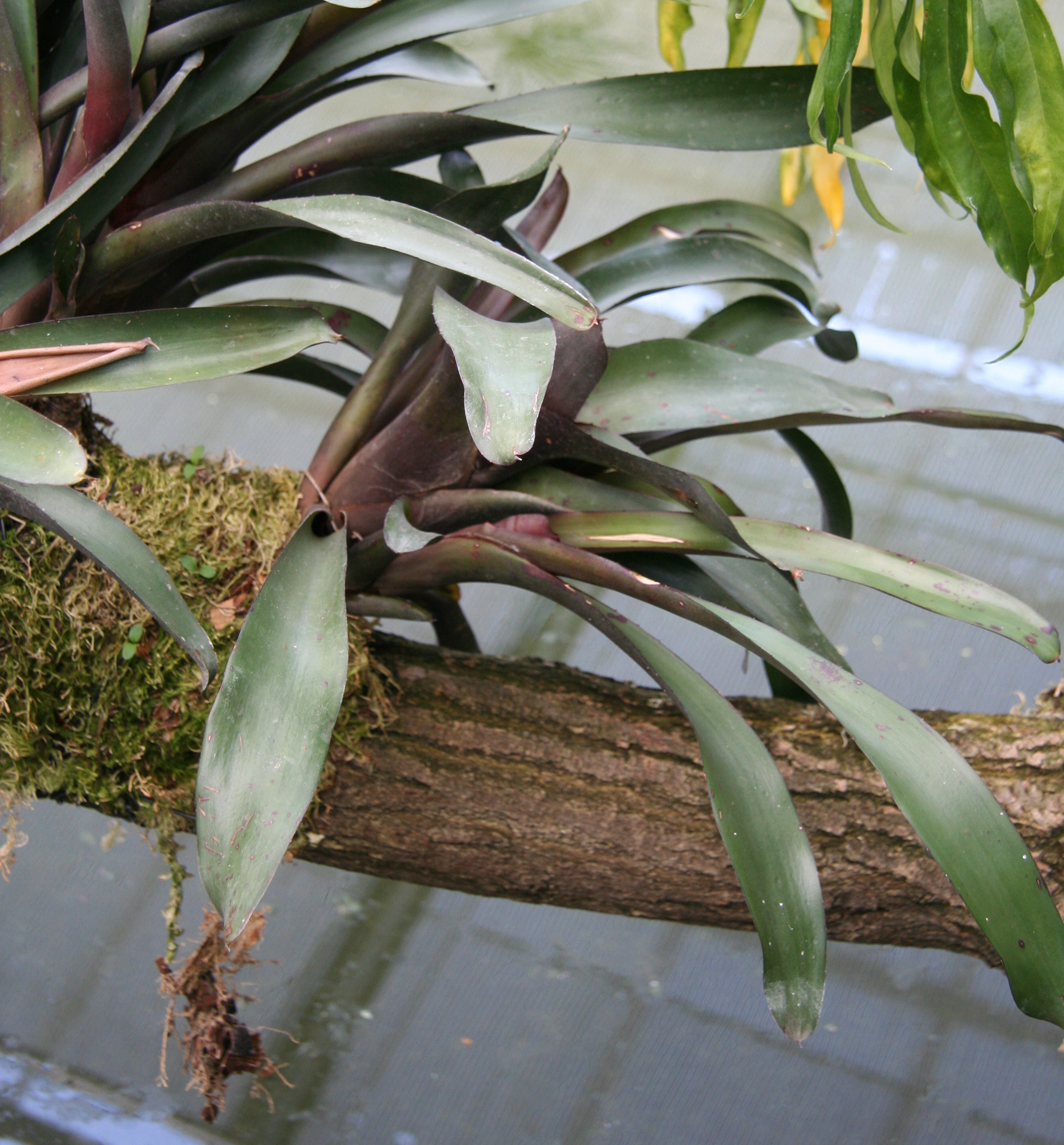

Scientific classification
- Kingdom: Plantae
- Clade: Embryophytes
- Clade: Tracheophytes
- Clade: Spermatophytes
- Clade: Angiosperms
- Clade: Monocots
- Clade: Commelinids
- Order: Poales
- Family: Bromeliaceae
- Genus: Neoregelia
- Subgenus: Neoregelia subg. Neoregelia
- Species: N. atroviridifolia

Binomial name
- Neoregelia atroviridifolia W.Weber & Röth

= Neoregelia atroviridifolia =

Species of flowering plant

Neoregelia atroviridifolia is a species of flowering plant in the genus Neoregelia. It is native to Brazil.
