= Neoregelia eltoniana =

Scientific classification
- Kingdom: Plantae
- Clade: Embryophytes
- Clade: Tracheophytes
- Clade: Spermatophytes
- Clade: Angiosperms
- Clade: Monocots
- Clade: Commelinids
- Order: Poales
- Family: Bromeliaceae
- Genus: Neoregelia
- Subgenus: Neoregelia subg. Neoregelia
- Species: N. eltoniana

Binomial name
- Neoregelia eltoniana W.Weber

Species of flowering plant

Neoregelia eltoniana is a species of flowering plant in the genus Neoregelia. It is endemic to Brazil.

== Cultivars ==
- Neoregelia 'Austin's Cool Orange'
- Neoregelia 'Brian's Beauty'
- Neoregelia 'Devin's Delight'
- Neoregelia 'Jazz'
- Neoregelia 'Travis Mays'
