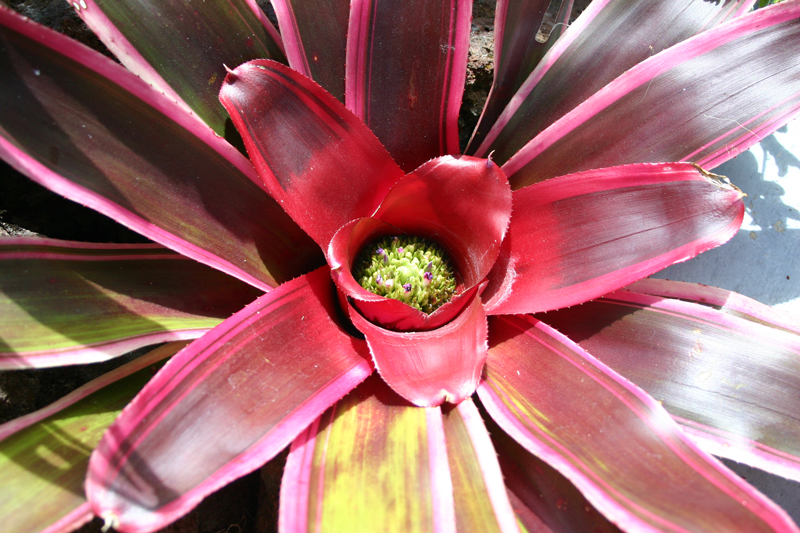
- Neoregelia in bloom at a botanical garden.

Scientific classification
- Kingdom: Plantae
- Clade: Embryophytes
- Clade: Tracheophytes
- Clade: Angiosperms
- Clade: Monocots
- Clade: Commelinids
- Order: Poales
- Family: Bromeliaceae
- Subfamily: Bromelioideae
- Genus: Neoregelia; L.B.Sm.

Subgenera
- See text.

Synonyms
- Regelia (Lem.) Lindm. 1890, illegitimate homonym, not Schauer 1843 nor H. Wendl. 1865

= Neoregelia =

Genus of flowering plants

Neoregelia is a genus of epiphytic flowering plants in the family Bromeliaceae, subfamily Bromelioideae, native to South American rainforests. The genus name is for Eduard August von Regel, Director of St. Petersburg Botanic Gardens in Russia (1875–1892).

== Description ==
Neoregelias are epiphytic plants, meaning they grow attached to the branches of forest trees; they do not naturally grow on soil, though they can be cultivated on the ground in controlled conditions, such as a garden, provided they are kept in a very airy growing medium such as pine bark that allows the root system to breathe. Their roots serve primarily as hold-fasts to grip their canopy perches and are adapted poorly to absorb nutrients, which is instead obtained through leaf litter, animal droppings and rainfall that collects in the prominent central cup exhibited by most species in the genus. They have mostly broad, relatively flat leaves often marked brightly with red, purple or yellow pigments which serve to protect the green photosynthetic tissues from sunburn and through selective breeding and hybridization, thousands of cultivars in many color combinations, many also striped with white, have been produced.

The inflorescences of these plants form in the shallow central depression - the "cup" - of the plant, which often partially fills with water, through which the flowers bloom. Neoregelias, like most bromeliads, bloom only once in their lifetime and then begin to die, but normally not before producing several pups - small clones of the parent plant - around the central flowering rosette on stolons. These offshoots eventually replace the mother plant and form a cluster around it - although in cultivation, the offshoots can be severed and replanted when about two-thirds the size of the adult plant. The leaves immediately surrounding the inflorescence are very often brightly colored, even in species otherwise not brightly marked - an adaptation to attract pollinating insects.

== Cultivation ==
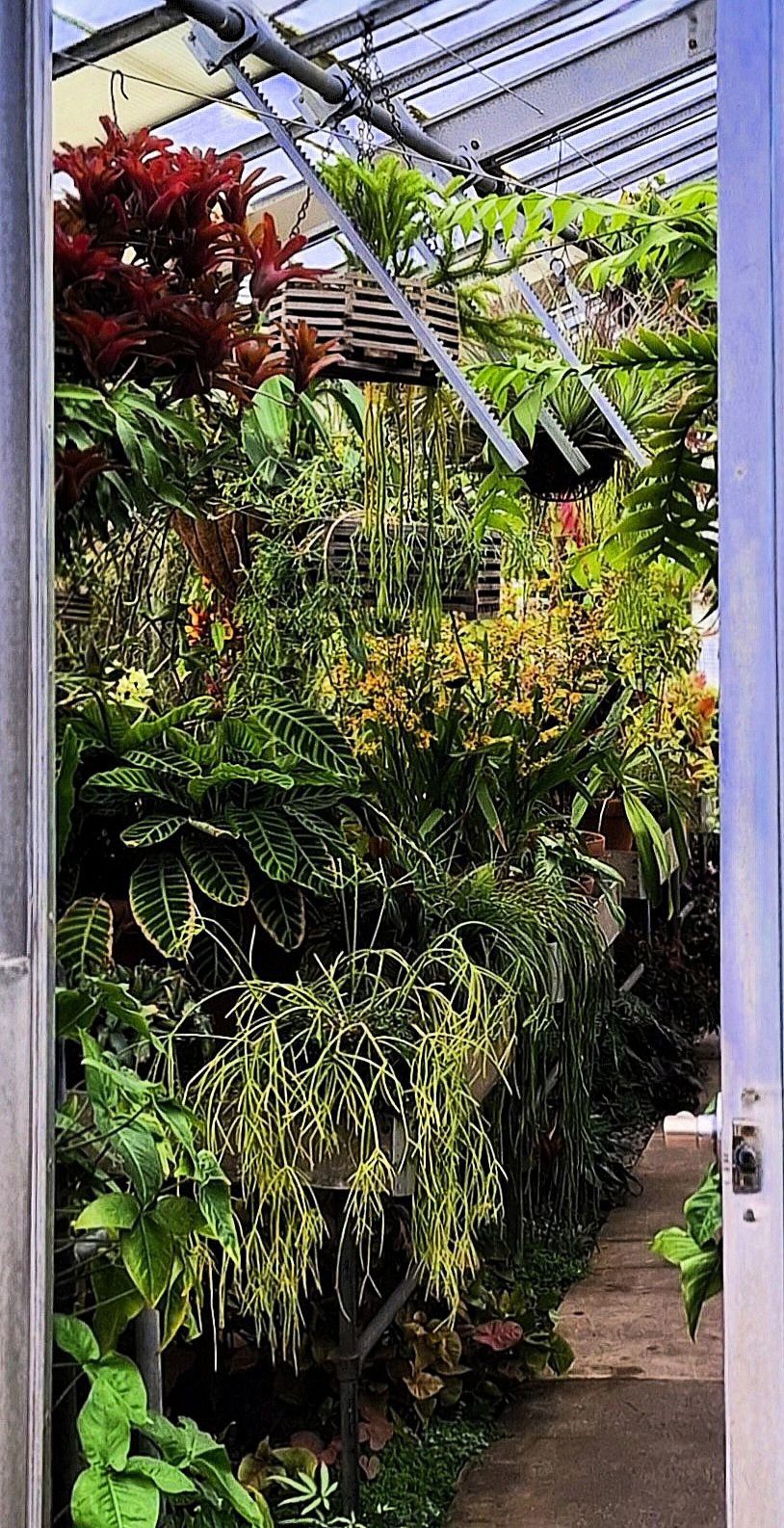
Plants in the Wave Hill Conservatory in New York City, including the popular Neoregelia 'Fireball' cultivar (upper left)

Neoregelia bromeliads and their hybrids, due to their varied forms and beautiful colors, are commonly cultivated as houseplants, or in warm climates as landscape plants. They are particularly suitable for vivarium culture. Their needs are simple, mainly consisting of bright light (most forms will revert to green if lighting is sub-optimal) and an airy growing medium - some species do not do well in soil and will be prone to rot due to their nature as epiphytes.

In temperate regions where temperatures fall below 10 °C (50 °F), they must be grown under glass or as houseplants. There are over 5000 registered cultivars.

== Symbiosis ==
Neoregelias are utilized by many species of poison dart frog to reproduce. The frogs raise their tadpoles in the security of the water-filled cup in the bromeliads' rosettes, allowing them to stay in the relative safety of the treetops and not have to venture to a pool on the ground where predators are likely much more numerous. Waste products from the frogs and their offspring, once deposited into the cup, are utilized by the plant for nourishment.

== Subgenera ==
As of November 2022, the Encyclopaedia of Bromeliads recognized three subgenera:

- N. subg. Longipetalopsis Leme
- N. subg. Neoregelia
- N. subg. Protoregelia W.Till & Leme

A former subgenus, N. subg. Hylaeaicum, was elevated to the genus Hylaeaicum in 2021.

== Species ==
As of November 2022, Plants of the World Online accepted the following species:

- Neoregelia abendrothae L.B.Sm.
- Neoregelia altocaririensis Leme & L.Kollmann
- Neoregelia alvimii Roeth
- Neoregelia amandae W.Weber
- Neoregelia ampullacea (É.Morren) L.B.Sm.
- Neoregelia angustibracteolata E.Pereira & Leme
- Neoregelia angustifolia E.Pereira
- Neoregelia atroviridifolia W.Weber & Roeth
- Neoregelia azevedoi Leme
- Neoregelia bahiana (Ule) L.B.Sm.
- Neoregelia binotii (É.Morren) L.B.Sm.
- Neoregelia bragarum (E.Pereira & L.B.Sm.) Leme
- Neoregelia brevifolia L.B.Sm. & Reitz
- Neoregelia brigadeirensis C.C.Paula & Leme
- Neoregelia brownii Leme
- Neoregelia burlemarxii Read (also spelt Neoregelia burle-marxii)
- Neoregelia camorimiana E.Pereira & I.A.Penna
- Neoregelia capixaba E.Pereira & Leme
- Neoregelia carcharodon (Jacob-Makoy ex Wittm.) L.B.Sm.
- Neoregelia carinata Leme
- Neoregelia carolinae (Beer) L.B.Sm.
- Neoregelia cathcartii C.F.Reed & Read
- Neoregelia chlorosticta (É.Morren) L.B.Sm.
- Neoregelia coimbrae E.Pereira & Leme
- Neoregelia compacta (Mez) L.B.Sm.
- Neoregelia concentrica (Vell.) L.B.Sm.
- Neoregelia coriacea (Antoine) L.B.Sm.
- Neoregelia correia-araujoi E.Pereira & I.A.Penna
- Neoregelia crispata Leme
- Neoregelia cruenta (Graham) L.B.Sm.
- Neoregelia cyanea (Beer) L.B.Sm.
- Neoregelia dactyloflammans Leme & L.Kollmann
- Neoregelia dayvidiana Leme & A.P.Fontana
- Neoregelia desenganensis Leme
- Neoregelia diversifolia E.Pereira
- Neoregelia doeringiana L.B.Sm.
- Neoregelia dungsiana E.Pereira
- Neoregelia eltoniana W.Weber
- Neoregelia farinosa (Ule) L.B.Sm.
- Neoregelia fluminensis L.B.Sm.
- Neoregelia fosteriana L.B.Sm.
- Neoregelia gavionensis Martinelli & Leme
- Neoregelia gigas Leme & L.Kollmann
- Neoregelia guttata Leme
- Neoregelia hoehneana L.B.Sm.
- Neoregelia ibitipocensis (Leme) Leme
- Neoregelia ilhana Leme
- Neoregelia indecora (Mez) L.B.Sm.
- Neoregelia inexspectata Leme
- Neoregelia insulana Leme
- Neoregelia johannis (Carrière) L.B.Sm.
- Neoregelia johnsoniae H.Luther
- Neoregelia kautskyi E.Pereira
- Neoregelia kerryi Leme (also spelt Neoregelia kerryae)
- Neoregelia kuhlmannii L.B.Sm.
- Neoregelia lactea H.Luther & Leme
- Neoregelia laevis (Mez) L.B.Sm.
- Neoregelia leprosa L.B.Sm.
- Neoregelia leucophoea (Baker) L.B.Sm.
- Neoregelia lilliputiana E.Pereira
- Neoregelia lillyae W.Weber
- Neoregelia longipedicellata Leme
- Neoregelia longisepala E.Pereira & I.A.Penna
- Neoregelia lymaniana R.Braga & Sucre
- Neoregelia macahensis (Ule) L.B.Sm.
- Neoregelia macrosepala L.B.Sm.
- Neoregelia maculata L.B.Sm.
- Neoregelia magdalenae L.B.Sm. & Reitz
- Neoregelia marmorata (Baker) L.B.Sm.
- Neoregelia martinellii W.Weber
- Neoregelia mcwilliamsii L.B.Sm.
- Neoregelia melanodonta L.B.Sm.
- Neoregelia menescalii Leme
- Neoregelia mucugensis Leme
- Neoregelia nevaresii Leme & H.Luther
- Neoregelia nivea Leme
- Neoregelia odorata Leme
- Neoregelia olens (Hook.f.) L.B.Sm.
- Neoregelia oligantha L.B.Sm.
- Neoregelia paratiensis Leme
- Neoregelia pascoaliana L.B.Sm.
- Neoregelia pauciflora L.B.Sm.
- Neoregelia paulistana E.Pereira
- Neoregelia pernambucana Leme & J.A.Siqueira
- Neoregelia petropolitana Leme
- Neoregelia pineliana (Lem.) L.B.Sm.
- Neoregelia pontualii Leme
- Neoregelia princeps (Baker) L.B.Sm.
- Neoregelia punctatissima (Ruschi) Ruschi
- Neoregelia retrorsa Leme & L.Kollmann
- Neoregelia richteri W.Weber
- Neoregelia roethii W.Weber
- Neoregelia rothinessa Leme, H.Luther & W.Till
- Neoregelia rubrifolia Ruschi
- Neoregelia rubrovittata Leme
- Neoregelia ruschii Leme & B.R.Silva
- Neoregelia sanguinea Leme
- Neoregelia sapiatibensis E.Pereira & I.A.Penna
- Neoregelia sarmentosa (Regel) L.B.Sm.
- Neoregelia schubertii Roeth
- Neoregelia seideliana L.B.Sm. & Reitz
- Neoregelia silvimontana Leme & J.A.Siqueira
- Neoregelia simulans L.B.Sm.
- Neoregelia smithii W.Weber
- Neoregelia spectabilis (Antoine) L.B.Sm.
- Neoregelia spiralipetala (Leme) Wand. & S.E.Martins
- Neoregelia tenebrosa Leme
- Neoregelia tigrina (Ruschi) Ruschi
- Neoregelia tristis (Beer) L.B.Sm.
- Neoregelia uleana L.B.Sm.
- Neoregelia viridolineata Leme
- Neoregelia viridovinosa Leme & L.Kollmann
- Neoregelia watersiana Leme
- Neoregelia wilsoniana M.B.Foster
- Neoregelia zaslawskyi E.Pereira & Leme
- Neoregelia zonata L.B.Sm.

=== Former species ===
Species transferred to Hylaeaicum include:

- Neoregelia eleutheropetala (Ule) L.B.Sm. → Hylaeaicum eleutheropetalum (Ule) Leme & Forzza
- Neoregelia leviana L.B.Sm. → Hylaeaicum levianum (L.B.Sm.) Leme & Forzza
- Neoregelia margaretae L.B.Sm. → Hylaeaicum margaretae (L.B.Sm.) Leme & Forzza
- Neoregelia mooreana L.B.Sm. → Hylaeaicum mooreanum (L.B.Sm.) Leme, Zizka & Aguirre-Santoro
- Neoregelia myrmecophila (Ule) L.B.Sm. → Hylaeaicum myrmecophilum (Ule) Leme & Forzza
- Neoregelia pendula L.B.Sm. → Hylaeaicum pendulum (L.B.Sm.) Leme, Zizka & Aguirre-Santoro
- Neoregelia rosea L.B.Sm. → Hylaeaicum roseum (L.B.Sm.) Leme, Zizka & Aguirre-Santoro
- Neoregelia stolonifera → Hylaeaicum stoloniferum (L.B.Sm.) Leme, Zizka & Aguirre-Santoro

== Gallery ==
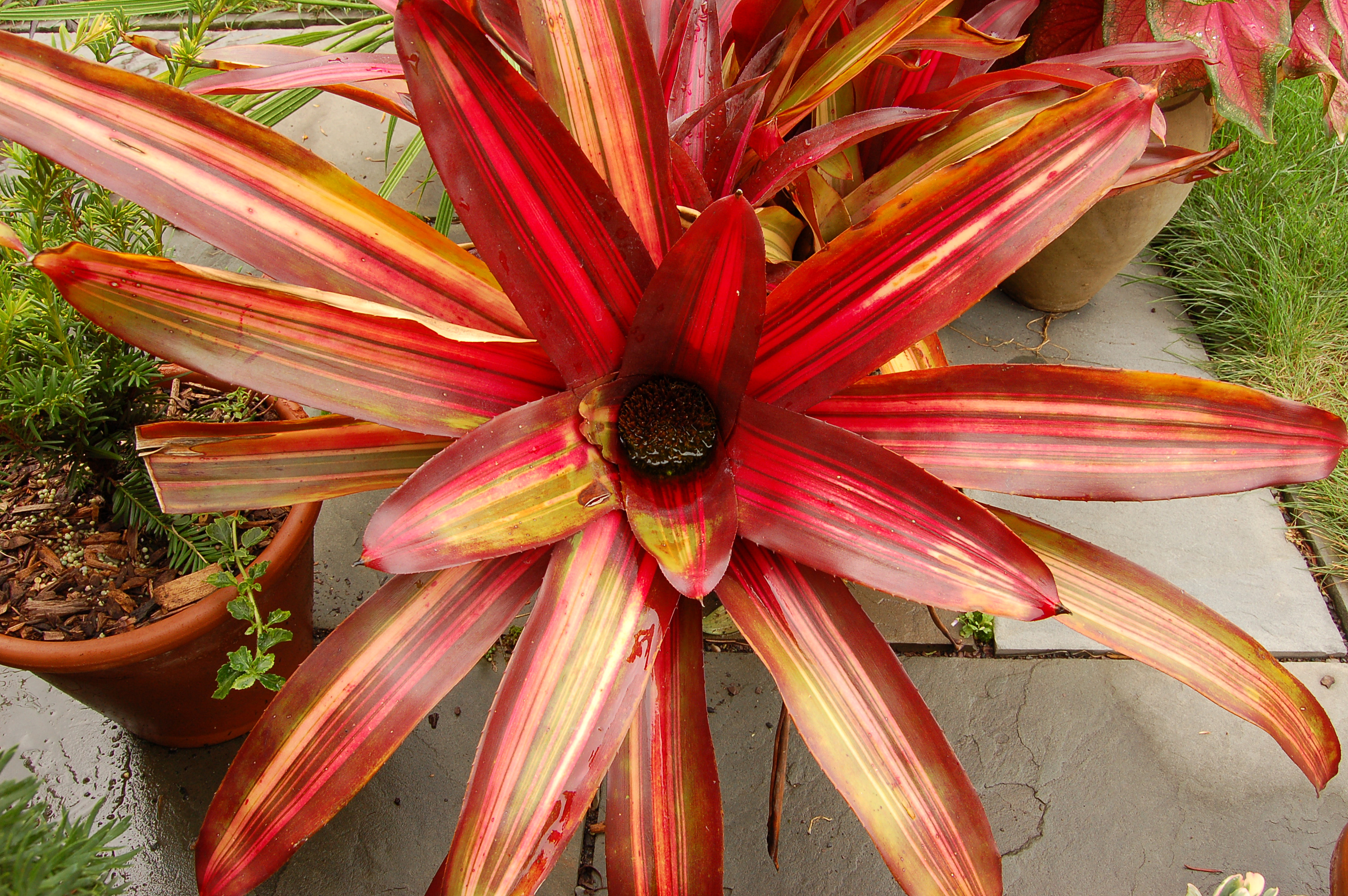
Neoregelia 'Perfection' plant

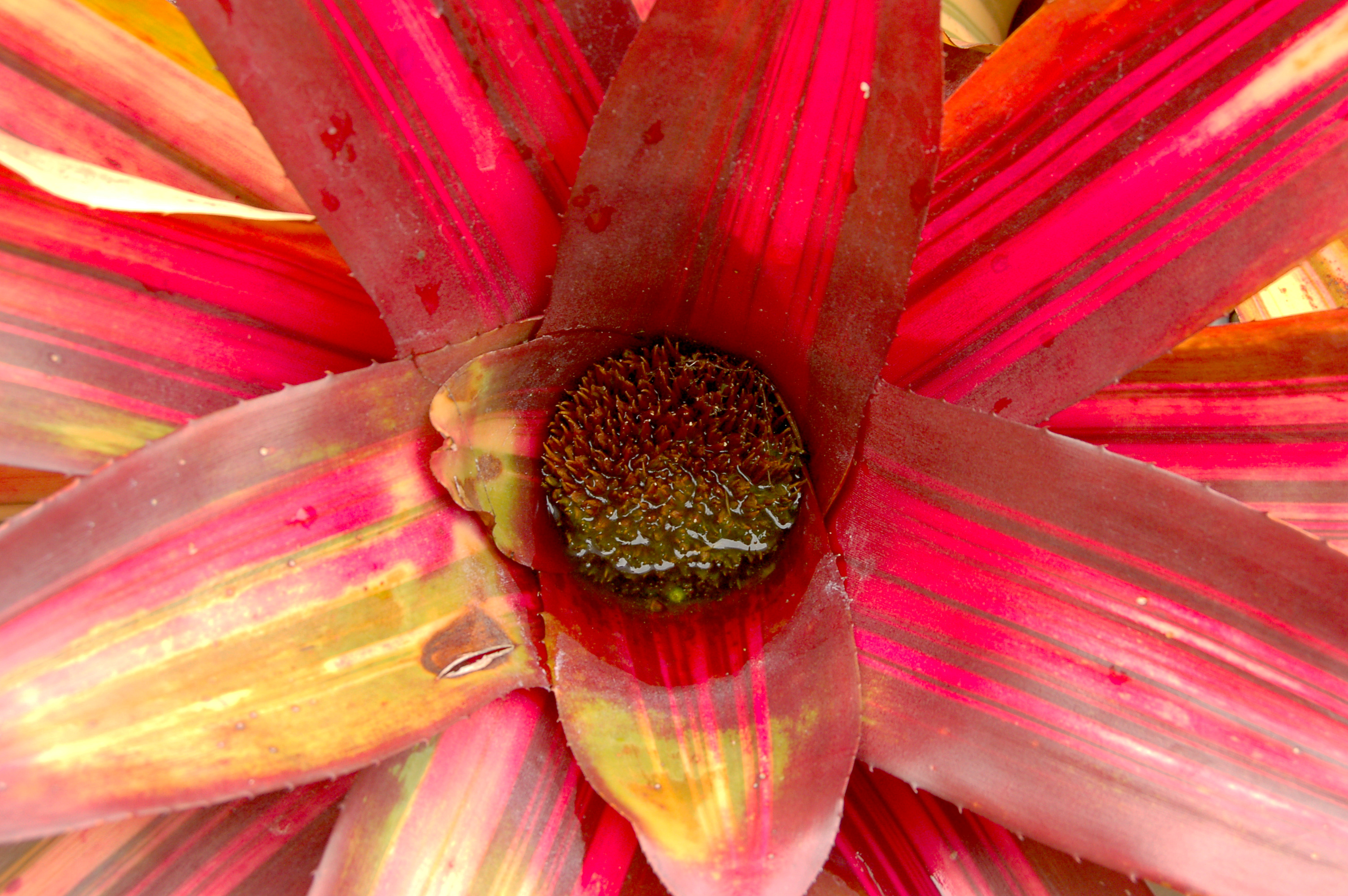
Neoregelia 'Perfection' closeup

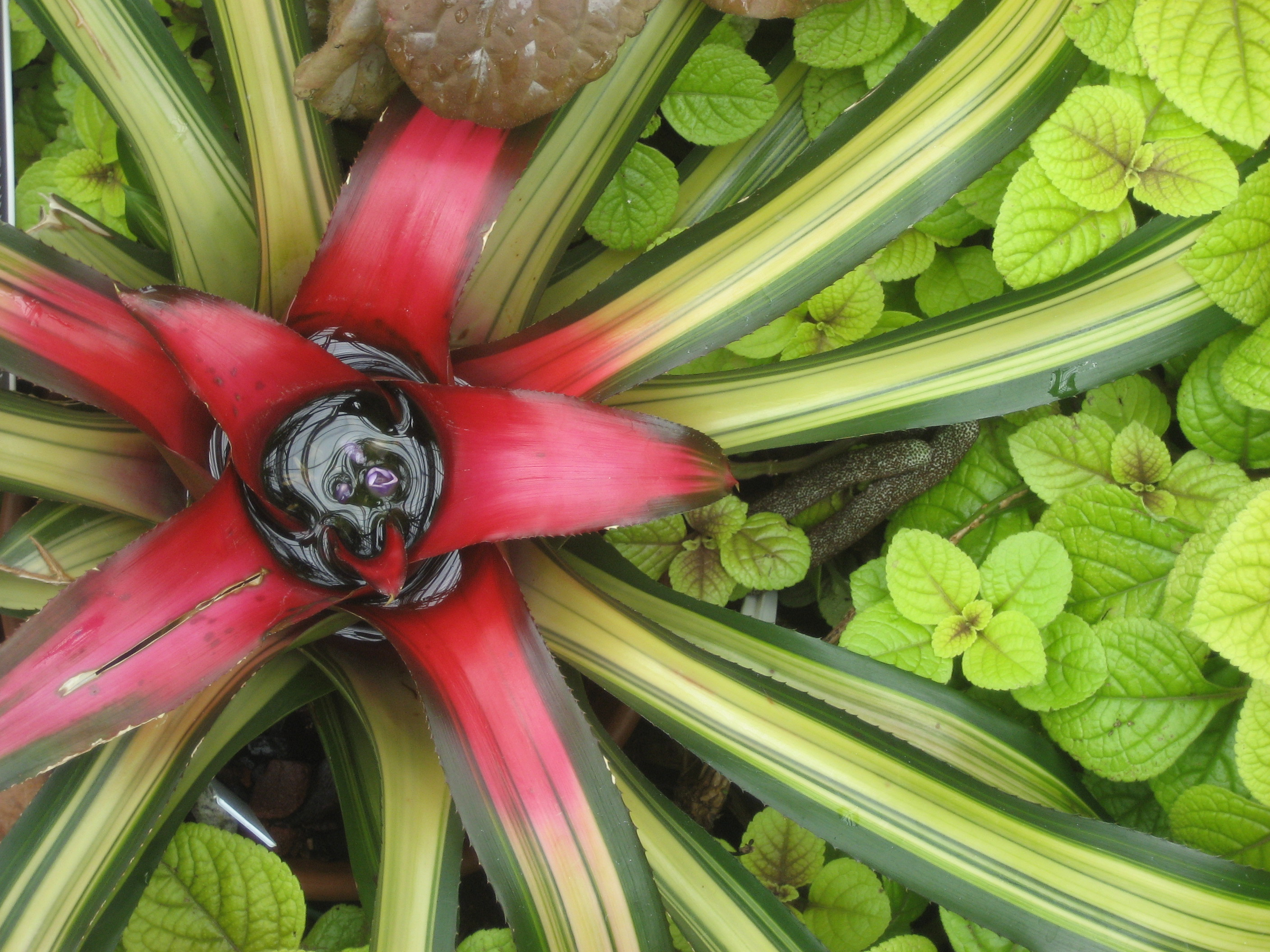
Photo of a Neoregelia at the United States Botanic Garden.

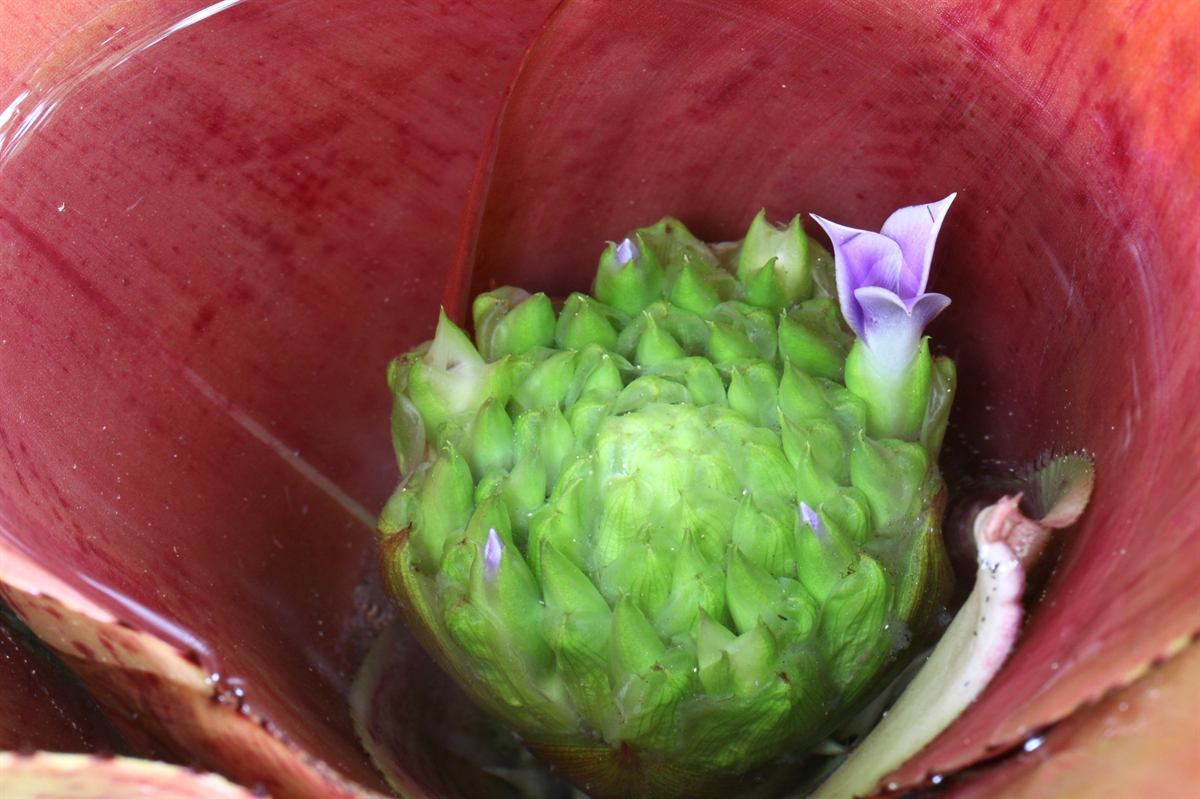
Neoregelia 'Yellow Devil' flower emerging from submerged inflorescence.

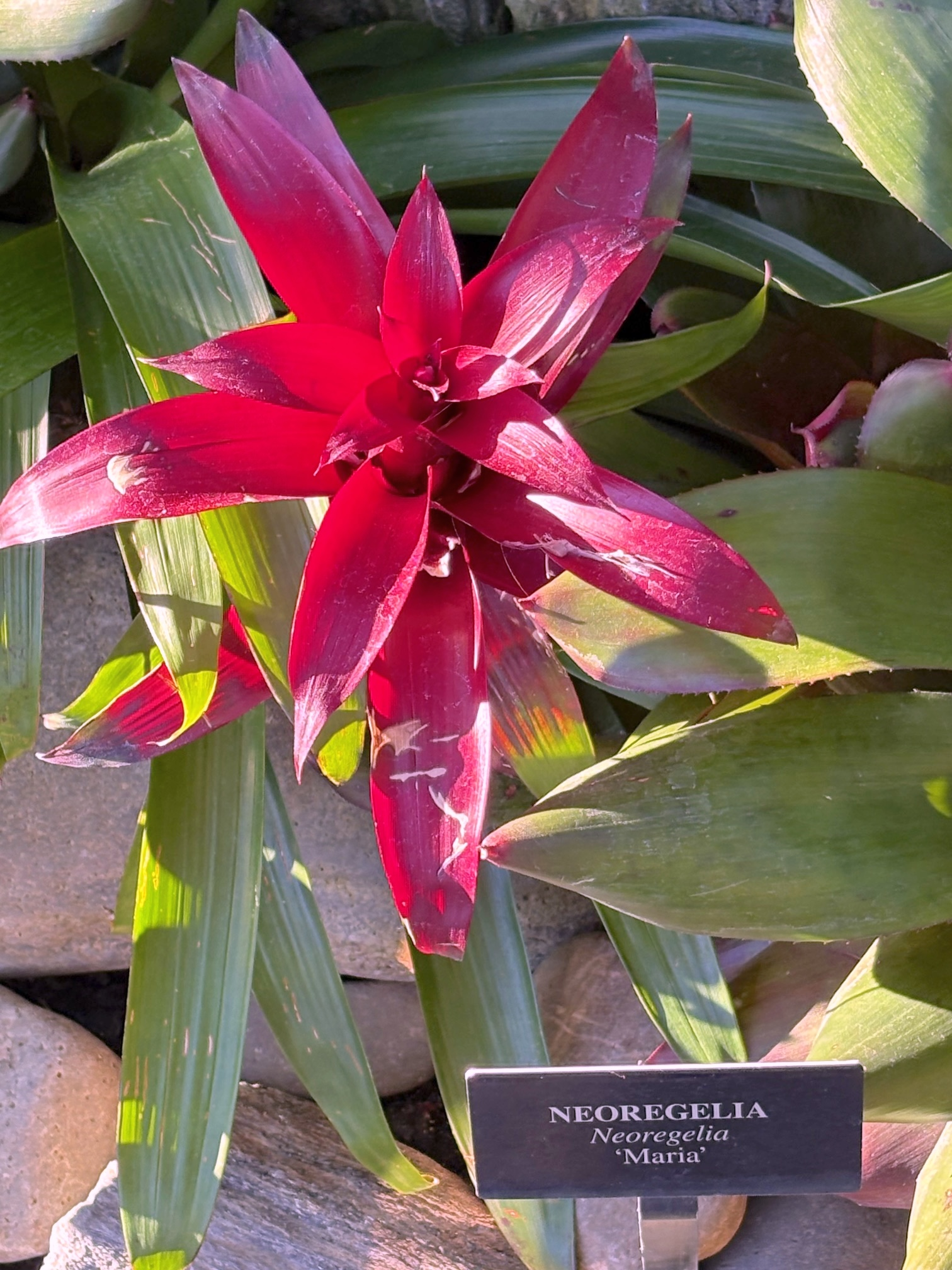
Neoregelia at Longwood Gardens, Pennsylvania, USA
