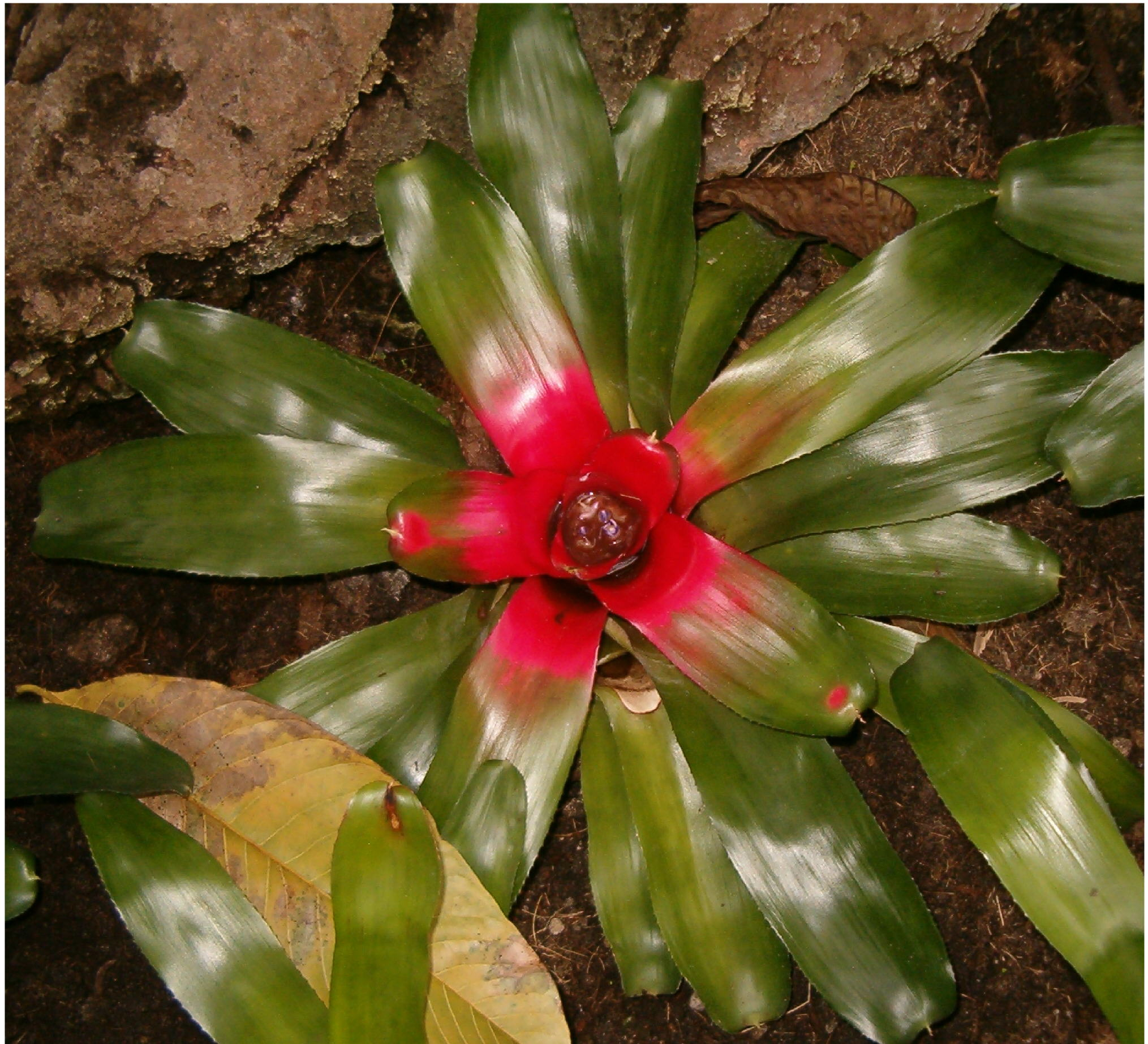
- Neoregelia carolinae

Scientific classification
- Kingdom: Plantae
- Clade: Tracheophytes
- Clade: Angiosperms
- Clade: Monocots
- Clade: Commelinids
- Order: Poales
- Family: Bromeliaceae
- Genus: Neoregelia
- Subgenus: Neoregelia subg. Neoregelia

Species
- See text

= Neoregelia subg. Neoregelia =

Subgenus of flowering plants

Neoregelia subg. Neoregelia is a subgenus of the genus Neoregelia.

== Species ==
Species accepted by Encyclopedia of Bromeliads as of October 2022:

- Neoregelia abendrothae L.B.Sm.
- Neoregelia amandae W.Weber
- Neoregelia ampullacea (E.Morren) L.B.Sm.
- Neoregelia angustibracteolata Pereira & Leme
- Neoregelia angustifolia E.Pereira
- Neoregelia atroviridifolia Weber & Röll
- Neoregelia binotii (Antoine) L.B.Sm.
- Neoregelia brevifolia L.B.Sm. & Reitz
- Neoregelia burle-marxii Read
- Neoregelia camorimiana Pereira & I.A.Penna
- Neoregelia capixaba Pereira & Leme
- Neoregelia carcharodon (Baker) L.B.Sm.
- Neoregelia carinata Leme
- Neoregelia carolinae (Beer) L.B.Sm.
- Neoregelia cathcartii C.F.Reed & Read
- Neoregelia chlorosticta (hort. Saunders ex W.Marshall) L.B.Sm.
- Neoregelia coimbrae Pereira & Leme
- Neoregelia compacta (Mez) L.B.Sm.
- Neoregelia concentrica (Vell.) L.B.Sm.
- Neoregelia coriacea (Antoine) L.B.Sm.
- Neoregelia correia-araujoi Pereira & I.A.Penna
- Neoregelia crispata Leme
- Neoregelia cruenta (Graham) L.B.Sm.
- Neoregelia cyanea (Beer) L.B.Sm.
- Neoregelia dactyloflammans Leme & L.Kollmann
- Neoregelia desenganensis Leme
- Neoregelia doeringiana L.B.Sm.
- Neoregelia dungsiana E.Pereira
- Neoregelia eltoniana W.Weber
- Neoregelia farinosa (Ule) L.B.Sm.
- Neoregelia fluminensis L.B.Sm.
- Neoregelia fosteriana L.B.Sm.
- Neoregelia gavionensis Martinelli & Leme
- Neoregelia guttata Leme
- Neoregelia hoehneana L.B.Sm.
- Neoregelia ilhana Leme
- Neoregelia indecora (Mez) L.B.Sm.
- Neoregelia insulana Leme
- Neoregelia johannis (Carrière) L.B.Sm.
- Neoregelia johnsoniae H.Luther
- Neoregelia kautskyi E.Pereira
- Neoregelia kuhlmannii L.B.Sm.
- Neoregelia lactea H.Luther & Leme
- Neoregelia laevis (Mez) L.B.Sm.
- Neoregelia leprosa L.B.Sm.
- Neoregelia leucophoea (Baker) L.B.Sm.
- Neoregelia lilliputiana E.Pereira
- Neoregelia lillyae W.Weber
- Neoregelia lymaniana R.Braga & Sucre
- Neoregelia macahensis (Ule) L.B.Sm.
- Neoregelia macrosepala L.B.Sm.
- Neoregelia maculata L.B.Sm.
- Neoregelia macwilliamsii L.B.Sm.
- Neoregelia magdalenae L.B.Sm. & Reitz
- Neoregelia marmorata (Baker) L.B.Sm.
- Neoregelia martinellii W.Weber
- Neoregelia melanodonta L.B.Sm.
- Neoregelia nevaresii Leme & H.Luther
- Neoregelia nivea Leme
- Neoregelia odorata Leme
- Neoregelia olens (Hook.f.) L.B.Sm.
- Neoregelia oligantha L.B.Sm.
- Neoregelia paratiensis Leme
- Neoregelia pascoaliana L.B.Sm.
- Neoregelia pauciflora L.B.Sm.
- Neoregelia petropolitana Leme
- Neoregelia pontualii Leme
- Neoregelia princeps (Baker) L.B.Sm.
- Neoregelia punctatissima (Ruschi) Ruschi
- Neoregelia richteri W.Weber
- Neoregelia roethii W.Weber
- Neoregelia rubrifolia Ruschi
- Neoregelia ruschii Leme & B.R.Silva
- Neoregelia sanguinea Leme
- Neoregelia sapiatibensis Pereira & I.A.Penna
- Neoregelia sarmentosa (Regel) L.B.Sm.
- Neoregelia seideliana L.B.Sm. & Reitz
- Neoregelia simulans L.B.Sm.
- Neoregelia smithii W.Weber
- Neoregelia spectabilis (Moore) L.B.Sm.
- Neoregelia tigrina (Ruschi) Ruschi
- Neoregelia tristis (Beer) L.B.Sm.
- Neoregelia uleana L.B.Sm.
- Neoregelia watersiana Leme
- Neoregelia wilsoniana M.B.Foster
- Neoregelia zaslawskyi Pereira & Leme
- Neoregelia zonata L.B.Sm.
