= Neoregelia nivea =

Scientific classification
- Kingdom: Plantae
- Clade: Tracheophytes
- Clade: Angiosperms
- Clade: Monocots
- Clade: Commelinids
- Order: Poales
- Family: Bromeliaceae
- Genus: Neoregelia
- Subgenus: Neoregelia subg. Neoregelia
- Species: N. nivea

Binomial name
- Neoregelia nivea Leme

Species of flowering plant

Neoregelia nivea is a plant species in the genus Neoregelia native to Brazil.

== Cultivars ==
- Neoregelia 'Key West'
