= Franz Antoine =

- Born: 23 February 1815; Paradeisgartl on the Löwelbastei, Vienna
- Died: 11 March 1886 (aged 71); Vienna
- Known for: Authority on the botanical family Bromeliaceae
- Scientific career
- Fields: Horticulture, Gardening, Botany
- Author abbrev. (botany): Antoine

Franz Antoine (23 February 1815 in the Paradeisgartl on the Löwelbastei, Vienna – 11 March 1886) was an Austrian horticulturalist and gardener. The standard author abbreviation Antoine is used to indicate this person as the author when citing a botanical name.

From 1865 he was director of royal gardens to the Austrian/Austro-Hungarian monarchy. He was an authority on the botanical family Bromeliaceae, and was also an avid photographer. His photographs of still lifes, plants and scenes of Vienna were presented at exhibitions in Vienna (1864, 1873) and Paris (1867). Among his written works were the following:

- Die Coniferen, (The conifers), (1840-1847).
- Der Wintergarten der K.K. Hofburg zu Wien, (The Winter Garden at the Hofburg Imperial Palace in Vienna), (1852).
- Coniferen des Cilicischen Taurus, (Conifers of Cilician Taurus) – with Theodor Kotschy, (1855).
- Phyto-Iconography der Bromeliaceen, (Photo-iconography of bromeliads), (1884).

His father, Franz Antoine the Elder (1768-1834), was also a gardener to Austrian royalty, with a gardener's residence – the younger Franz' birthplace – in the Paradeisgartl garden, now part of the Volksgarten, Vienna.
