= Bolster heath =

Type of vegetation community

Bolster heath or cushion moorland is a type of vegetation community that features a patchwork of very low growing, tightly packed plants found at the limits of some alpine environments. The cushion plants form a smooth surfaced 'cushions' from several different plants, hence the common name of cushion heath. The cushion growth habit provides protection against the desiccating wind and help keep the cluster warm.

Bolster heath is very slow growing and thus very fragile. Most propagation is by slow expansion, although two species, Abrotanella forsteroides and Pterygopappus lawrencei produce enough viable seed to survive fire. The other species are generally permanently destroyed by fire.

The soil in bolster heath is generally quite poor, often gravel with a thin layer of peat.

== Tasmanian bolster heaths ==
=== Asteraceae ===
- Abrotanella forsteroides (Abrotanella)
- Ewartia meredithiae (Ewartia)
- Pterygopappus lawrencei (Pterygopappus)

=== Caryophyllaceae ===
- Colobanthus pulvinatus (Colobanthus)
- Scleranthus biflorus (Scleranthus)

=== Donatiaceae ===
- Donatia novae-zelandiae (Donatia)

=== Epacridaceae ===
- Dracophyllum minimum (Dracophyllum)

=== Loganiaceae ===
- Mitrasacme archeri (Mitrasacme)

=== Scrophulariaceae ===
- Chionohebe ciliolata (Chionohebe)

=== Stylidiaceae ===
- Phyllachne colensoi (Phyllachne)

=== Thymelaeaceae ===
- Pimelea pygmaea (Pimelea)

=== Centrolepidaceae ===
- Centrolepis monogyna (Centrolepis)
- Centrolepis muscoides (Centrolepis)
- Gaimardia fitzgeraldii (Gaimardia)
- Gaimardia setacea (Gaimardia)

=== Cyperaceae ===
- Carpha rodwayi (Carpha)
- Oreobolus acutifolius (Oreobolus)
- Oreobolus oligocephalus (Oreobolus)
- Oreobolus oxycarpus (Oreobolus)
- Oreobolus pumilio (Oreobolus)
