= Tasmanian cushion plants =

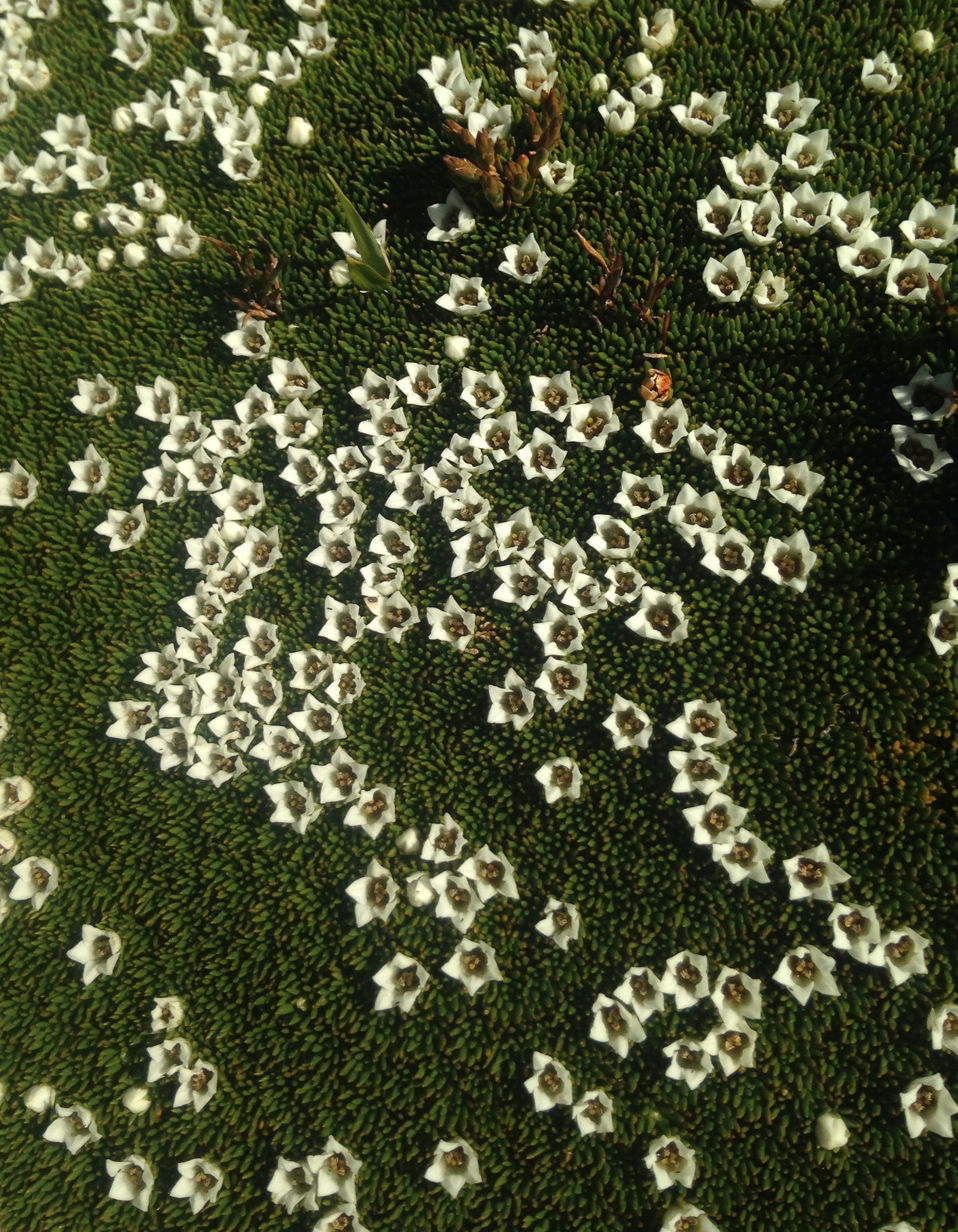
Donatia novae-zelandiae in flower, Cradle Mountain Lake Saint Clair National Park, Tasmania

Tasmanian cushion plants are low growing, highly compact, woody, spreading mats that can grow up to 3 m in diameter, located mainly on the island of Tasmania. These mats are made up of tightly packed stems that grow at the same rate so that no apical rosettes protrude above the rest. The term cushion plant refers to a characteristic growth habit adopted by various species from a range of families to adapt to alpine and subalpine environments and areas of high latitude. They are adapted to grow in low nutrient areas and typically have deep taproots. Cushion plants are very slow growing and do not grow high above ground; mounds typically remain under 30 cm high. Underneath the living surface of the cushion, the plants either allow dead leaves to persist or produce non-photosynthetic material, resulting in an insulating effect.

== Floristics of Tasmanian cushion plant community ==
Six families, including seven species, of cushion plants occur in Tasmania, and one additional family and species occur on Macquarie Island. Three additional families, including seven species, can adapt to the bolster habit, although not exclusively. The cushion plant growth habit is linked with drainage and the plant's ability to redirect water flow due to its growth pattern.

Family	Scientific name	Common name	Description
Asteraceae	Abrotanella forsteroides	tasmanian cushionplant	Endemic to Tasmania. Leaves are bright green, crowded, thick and sheathing from the base to a pointed tip. Flowers are a tiny white daisy held just above the leaves.
Asteraceae	Pterygopappus lawrencei	sage cushionplant	Endemic to Tasmania. A compact sage blue/green cushion; leaves are tiny, thick and closely overlapping, broadly spathulate with pointed tips and a silky, hairy base. Flowers are a terminal single white daisy held just above foliage.
Caryophyllaceae	Colobanthus pulvinatus	cushion cupflower	A compact, rigid cushion plant with stiff, prickly leaves with thickened margins, 2 – 5 mm long. Flowers are solitary with yellow/green cup-shaped sepals tucked in the foliage. Listed as rare under the Threatened Species Protection Act 1995. Also found in NSW.
Donatiaceae	Donatia novae-zelandiae	snow cushionplant	Bright green, hard and compact cushion. Leaves are linear, fleshy and pointed, 5 – 6 mm long, with fine hairs at the base. Solitary flowers have 5 white petals and grow at the same level as the leaves. Also found in New Zealand.
Epacridaceae	Dracophyllum minimum	claspleaf heath	Endemic to Tasmania. Densely branched, compact, hard, mounding cushion. Leaves are thick and rigid, broad, sheathing and slightly concave with a hard point. White, solitary tubular flowers sit directly on top of foliage.
Scrophulariaceae	Veronica ciliolate Previous name: Chionohebe ciliolate	Ben Lomond cushion plant	Endemic to Tasmania. Soft, compact, rounded cushion. Leaves are light green and in dense basal rosettes, 2.5 – 4 mm long, 2 mm wide, pointed, with a tuft of silky hairs at tip. Flowers have 5 white petals and two groups of stamen fused to the petal tube. Veronica ciliolate subsp. Fiordensis is listed as vulnerable under both the Threatened Species Protection Act 1995 and the Environment Protection and Biodiversity Conservation Act 1999.
Stylidiaceae	Phyllachne colensoi	Yellow cushionplant	A dense, tufted cushion plant with a distinct yellowish colour. Leaves are wider at the base and narrow to a blunt tip with a glandular pore, 3 – 4 mm long, densely packed around the stem. Flowers are white, single and terminal with 5-6 spreading lobes. The column is held above the petals. Also found in New Zealand.
Apiaceae	Azorella macquariensis	Macquarie cushions	Endemic and restricted to Macquarie Island. Leaf has reniform outline, with 3 or 5 lanceolate lobes, they are free to the base, acute and pungent, with a setose point. Flowers are bisexual and solitary; two leaf-like lanceolate bracts are fused at the base to form a cup. Listed as endangered under the Threatened Species Protection Act 1995 and critically endangered under the Environment Protection and Biodiversity Conservation Act 1999.

== Evolution ==
The cushion plant is an example of convergent evolution. Unrelated species from a number of different families on separate continents have evolved the cushion form to adapt to similarly harsh environments.

== Ecosystem function ==
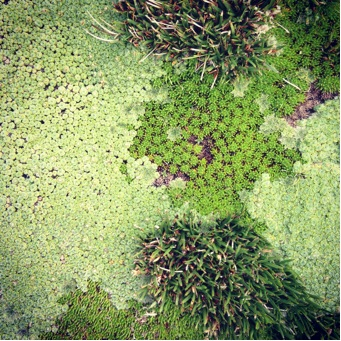
Pterygopappus lawrencei and Dracophyllum minimum growing together, Cradle Mountain Lake Saint Clair National Park, Tasmania

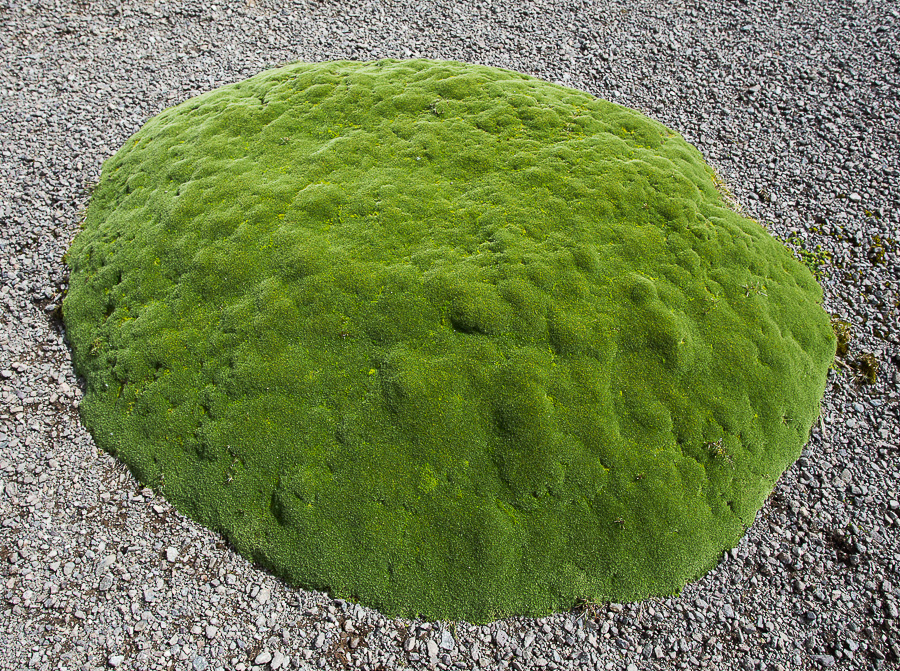
Azorella macquariensis cushion plant on Macquarie Island

Cushion plants have been shown to be a keystone species in the ecosystem in which they occur. For example, Azorella macquariensis is the only cushion-forming plant that occurs on Macquarie Island and it plays a vital role in the ecosystem as it makes up the major structural component of feldmark vegetation on the island. Cushion plants are also often considered "nurse species", as their presence is necessary in order for many other alpine species to become established. Cushion plants have been found to enhance species richness in areas with inherent impoverished local diversity. This effect is due to their low and compact growth form that alleviates severe alpine conditions.

Several Tasmanian cushion species have been found to have a surface temperature up to 10 °C greater than the ambient temperatures. The warmer temperatures allow the plants to continue to photosynthesize and grow in conditions that would otherwise inhibit such productivity. This substantially extends the growing season. In addition, a combination of the insulating properties of past growth under the surface of the cushion plants and the peaty soils in which they grow prevents temperatures around the roots dropping below -1 °C, which stops the roots from freezing. Surrounding plants species have adapted to not only benefit, but rely on these conditions the cushion plants provide to survive and grow, and are restricted to habitats in which cushions are present.

== Threats ==
Three Tasmanian cushion plant species are listed as "under threat": Veronica ciliolata (subspecies fiordensis), Azorella macquariensis and Colobanthus pulvinatus.

Tasmanian endemic species, Veronica ciliolata subspecies fiordensis, is listed as vulnerable under both the Threatened Species Protection Act 1995 and the Environment Protection and Biodiversity Conservation Act 1999. The total population of mature individuals is estimated to be from 1500 to 2000. Threats include:

- Ski field expansion and other inappropriate development of the Ben Lomond plateau, in which the population is restricted
- Climate change and an increase in temperatures that may negatively affect this species if suitable alpine habitat within possible dispersal range diminishes
- Stochastic events including landslides, drought, pathogens and inadvertent damage, to which the species' low range has made it particularly vulnerable if such events occur

Azorella macquariensis, which is endemic to Macquarie Island, is listed as endangered under the Threatened Species Protection Act 1995 and Critically Endangered under the Environment Protection and Biodiversity Conservation Act 1999. Since 2008, this species has encountered substantial dieback and has had a catastrophic decline in population size. The cause of the dieback is unknown and under investigation. Once dead, the cushions may erode and as a result could have adverse impacts on the rest of feldmark vegetation due to its vital structural role in the ecosystem. Potential factors that threaten Azorella macquariensis include:

- Feldmark vegetation has been identified to be at risk to a change in climate if temperatures increase, drier soil conditions, less rainfall and increased frosts occur.
- The introduction of an alien species such as a plant, vertebrate, invertebrate or pathogen, could have detrimental effects on the species, either directly, through infection or competition, or indirectly, through habitat degradation.

Colobanthus pulvinatus is listed as rare under the Threatened Species Protection Act 1995.
