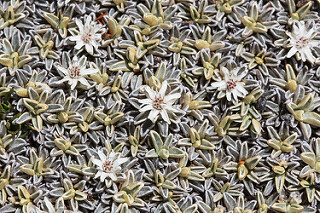

Scientific classification
- Kingdom: Plantae
- Clade: Tracheophytes
- Clade: Angiosperms
- Clade: Eudicots
- Clade: Asterids
- Order: Asterales
- Family: Asteraceae
- Genus: Ewartia
- Species: E. meredithiae

Binomial name
- Ewartia meredithiae (F.Muell.) Beauverd

= Ewartia meredithiae =

Tasmanian endemic plant species

Ewartia meredithiae, commonly known as the rusty cushion plant, is a Tasmanian endemic cushion plant species. Out of the four species in Australia from this small genus, Tasmania has three, all of which are low growing, alpine species.

== Description ==
The close branching of shoots, short internodes and tightly packed stems cause the characteristic hemispherical shape of a cushion plant species. It can spread approximately 1 metre in diameter with its adventitious roots forming at various points along the prostrate branches. The leaves are silver grey in colour with rust-coloured hairs. In shape, the leaves are broadly oval and approximately 10mm long. At the ends of the branches, small, white, papery flower heads occur in summer. This morphology allows this species to be very frost tolerant.

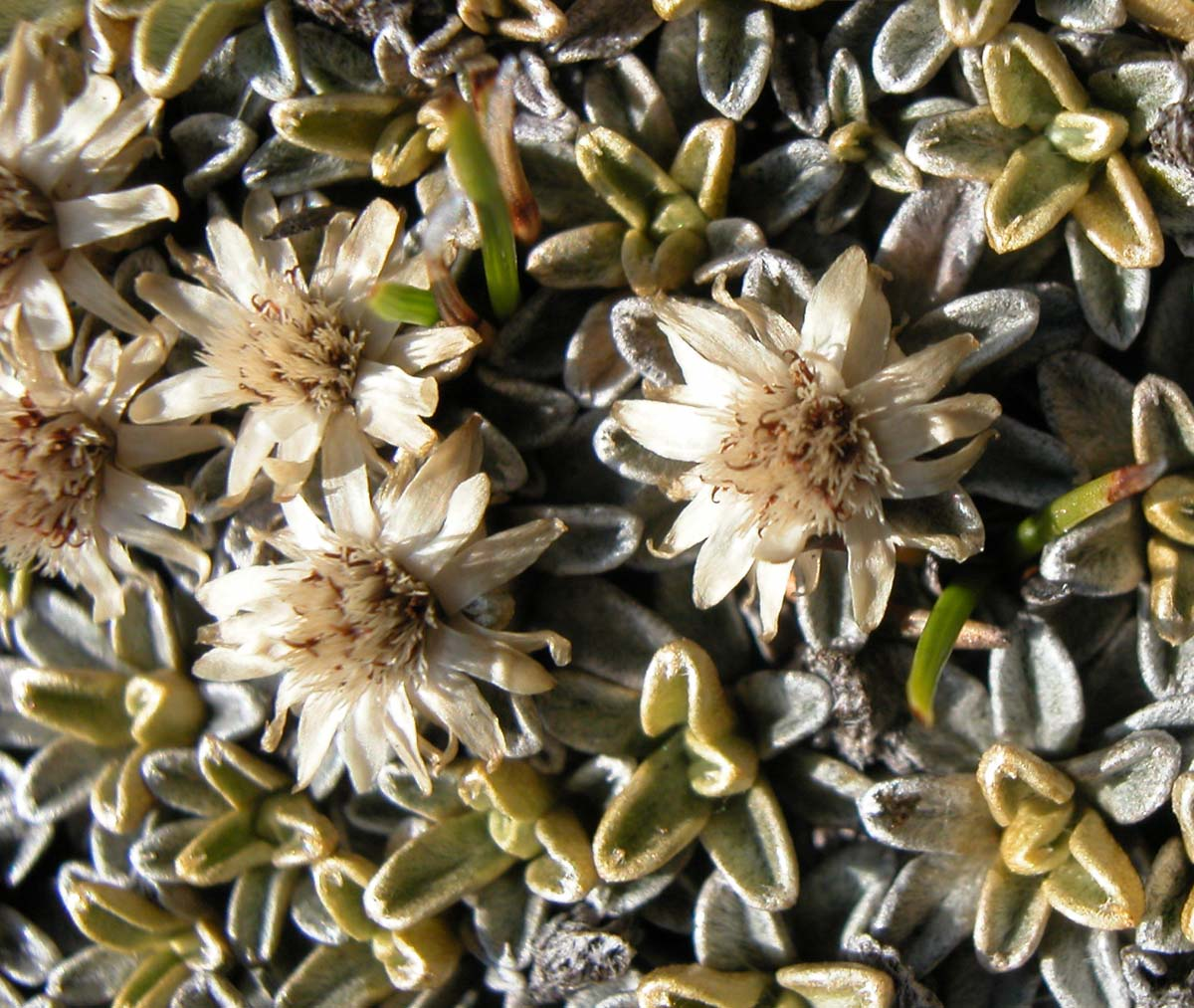
E. meredithiae has papery, white terminal flowers

== Distribution and habitat ==
This species is endemic to Tasmania, meaning it is not found anywhere else. It exists in montane vegetation and bolster heath communities throughout the alpine areas of the central and western Tasmanian mountains.

== Evolution ==
The cushion plants are a great example of convergent evolution. Convergent evolution is defined as when different lineages of structures are similar to each other, but do not share a common ancestor. This is typical of plants which inhabit harsh environments as there may only be a limited number of biological solutions to the physiological demands of harsh environments. Tasmanian cushion plants converged due to wind activity at such high altitudes, the funnelling of wind will blow away anything that grows too tall. Additionally, the density of the packed stems in the cushion plant prevents deep freezing during the winter months.

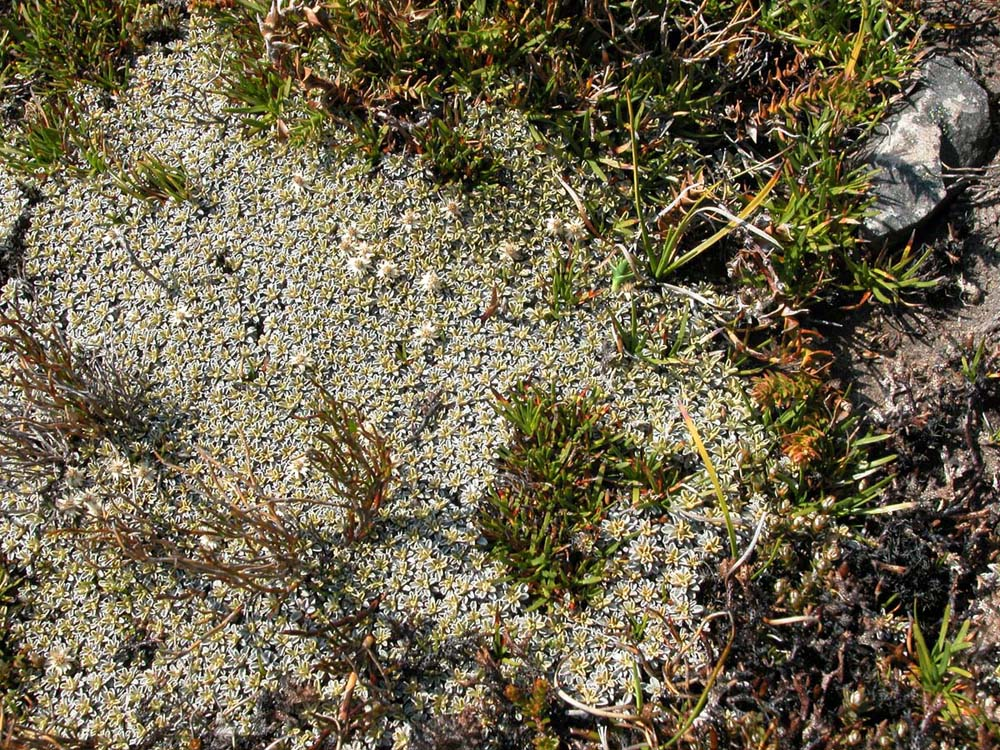
E. meredithiae amongst other Tasmanian alpine species

== Phylogeny ==
Tasmania has three species of Ewartia, all of which are low growing, hairy alpine species. Ewartia meredithiae is easily distinguished since it is the only cushion-forming species, the other two are mat-forming plants. The Australian species of Ewartia are heterogeneous and polyphyletic. In particular the relationships of Ewartia meredithiae are unclear as compared to other Gnaphalieae species.

Species	Habit	Habitat	Photo
Ewartia meredithiae	Cushion- forming with clusters of rust coloured rosettes and small, white flowers	It exists in montane vegetation and bolster heath communities throughout the alpine areas of the central and western Tasmanian mountains	Ewartia meredithiae
Ewartia catipes	Mat-forming, alpine plant with clustered, solitary flower heads	It is found on the eastern and central mountains in grassy or disturbed areas	
Ewartia planchonii	Uncommon alpine species which is mat-forming with wooly white leaves and stems forming clumps	It is mostly found in exposed places at high altitudes in the central mountains	Ewartia planchonii
