= Ewartia =

Ewartia is the scientific name of two genera of organisms and may refer to:

- Ewartia (cicada), a genus of insects in the family Cicadidae
- Ewartia (plant), a genus of plants in the family Asteraceae
