= Heath =

Shrubland habitat

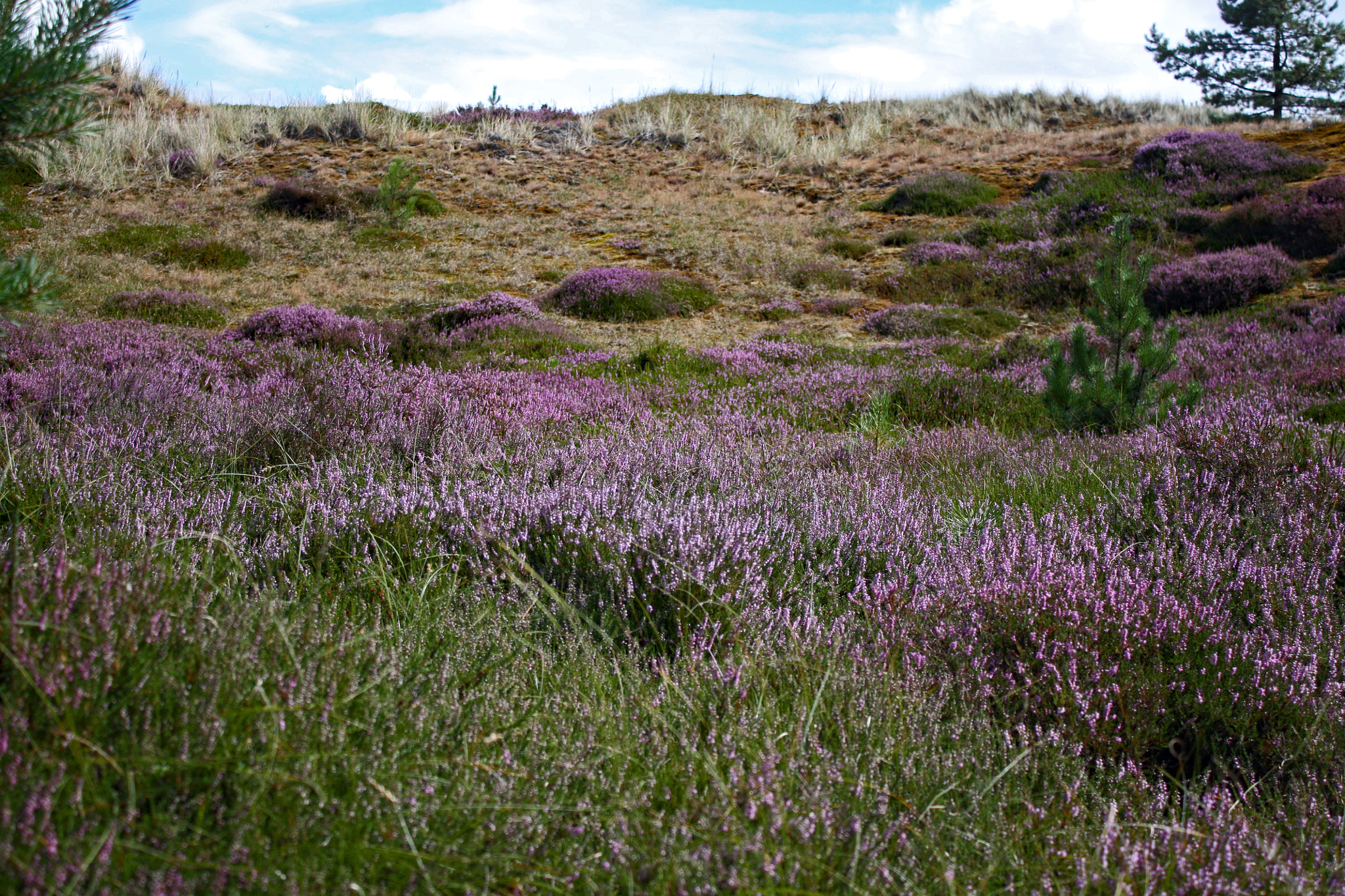
Flowering heath in Amrum, Germany

A heath (/hiːθ/) is a shrubland habitat found mainly on free-draining infertile, acidic soils and is characterised by open, low-growing woody vegetation. Moorland is generally related to high-ground heaths with—especially in Great Britain—a cooler and damper climate.

Heaths are widespread worldwide but are rapidly disappearing and considered a rare habitat in Europe. They form extensive and highly diverse communities across Australia in humid and sub-humid areas where fire regimes with recurring burning are required for the maintenance of the heathlands. Even more diverse though less widespread heath communities occur in Southern Africa. Extensive heath communities can also be found in the Texas chaparral, New Caledonia, central Chile, and along the shores of the Mediterranean Sea. In addition to these extensive heath areas, the vegetation type is also found in scattered locations across all continents, except Antarctica.

== Characteristics ==
Heathland is favoured where climatic conditions are typically hard and dry, particularly in summer, and soils acidic, of low fertility, and often sandy and very free-draining; a mire may occur where drainage is poor, but usually is only small in extent. Heaths are dominated by low shrubs, 20 centimetres (8 in) to 2 metres (7 feet) tall.

Heath vegetation can be extremely plant-species rich, and heathlands of Australia are home to some 3,700 endemic or typical species in addition to numerous less restricted species. The fynbos heathlands of South Africa are second only to tropical rainforests in plant biodiversity with over 7,000 species. In marked contrast, the tiny pockets of heathland in Europe are extremely depauperate with a flora consisting primarily of heather (Calluna vulgaris), heath (Erica species) and gorse (Ulex species).

The bird fauna of heathlands are usually cosmopolitan species of the region. In the depauperate heathlands of Europe, bird species tend to be more characteristic of the community, and include Montagu's harrier and the tree pipit. In Australia the heathland avian fauna is dominated by nectar-feeding birds such as honey-eaters and lorikeets, although numerous other birds from emus to eagles are also common in Australian heathlands. The birds of the South African fynbos include sunbirds, warblers and siskins. Heathlands are also an excellent habitat for insects including ants, moths, butterflies and wasps; many species are restricted entirely to it. One such example of an organism restricted to heathland is the silver-studded blue butterfly, Plebejus argus.

== Anthropogenic heaths ==
Anthropogenic heath habitats are a cultural landscape that can be found worldwide in locations as diverse as Northern and Western Europe, the Americas, Australia, New Zealand, Madagascar and New Guinea.

These heaths were initially made or expanded by centuries of human clearance of the natural forest and woodland vegetation by grazing and burning. In some cases, this clearance went so far that parts of the heathland have given way to open spots of pure sand and sand dunes, with a local climate that, even in Europe, can rise to temperatures of 50 °C (122 °F) in summer, drying the sand spot bordering the heathland and further raising its vulnerability for wildfires. Referring to heathland in England, Oliver Rackham says, "Heaths are clearly the product of human activities and need to be managed as heathland; if neglected, they turn into woodland".

The conservation value of these human-made heaths has become much more appreciated due to their historical cultural value as habitats; consequently, most heathlands are protected. However, tree incursion also threatens them because of the discontinuation of traditional management techniques, such as grazing and burning, that mediated the landscapes. Some are also threatened by urban sprawl. Anthropogenic heathlands are maintained artificially by a combination of grazing and periodic burning (known as swailing), or (rarely) mowing; if not so maintained, they are rapidly recolonised by forest or woodland. The recolonising tree species will depend on what is available as the local seed source, and thus it may not reflect the natural vegetation before the heathland became established.

== In literature ==
The heath features prominently in:

- King Lear, by William Shakespeare
- Wuthering Heights, by Emily Brontë
- The Return of the Native, by Thomas Hardy
- Ethan Frome, by Edith Wharton
- The Letters of Vincent van Gogh, by Vincent van Gogh

== Gallery ==
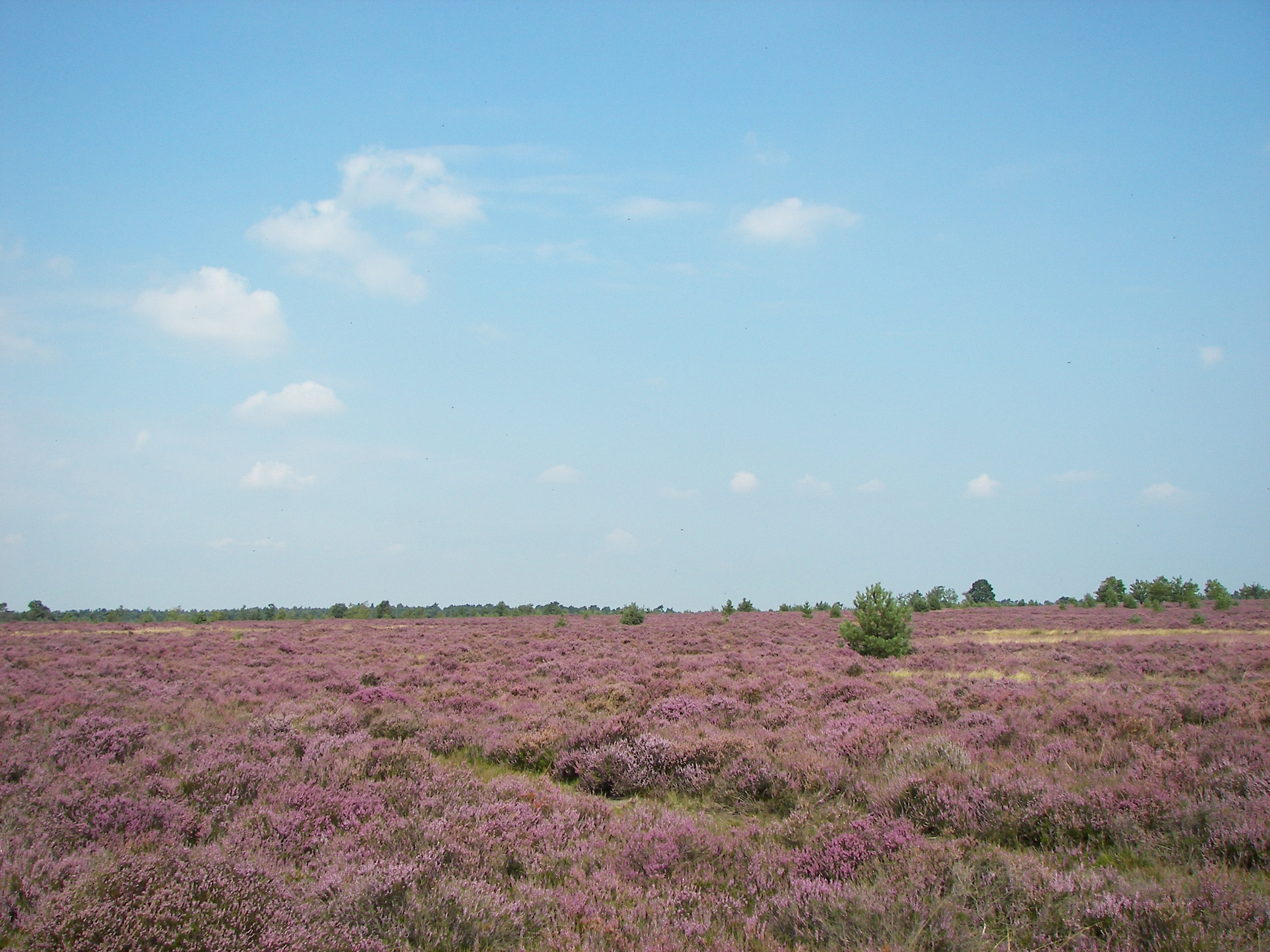
Lüneburg Heath, an anthropogenic heath in Lower Saxony, northern Germany

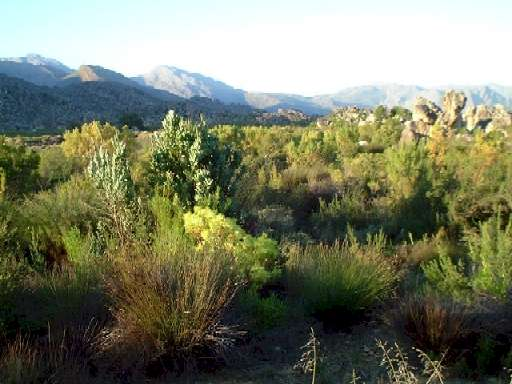
Fynbos heathland, South Africa

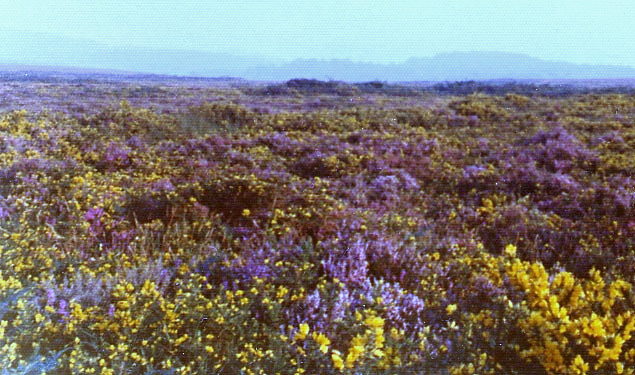
Heathland at Woodbury Common, Devon (England), featuring purple flowers of Calluna vulgaris and yellow flowers of Ulex gallii

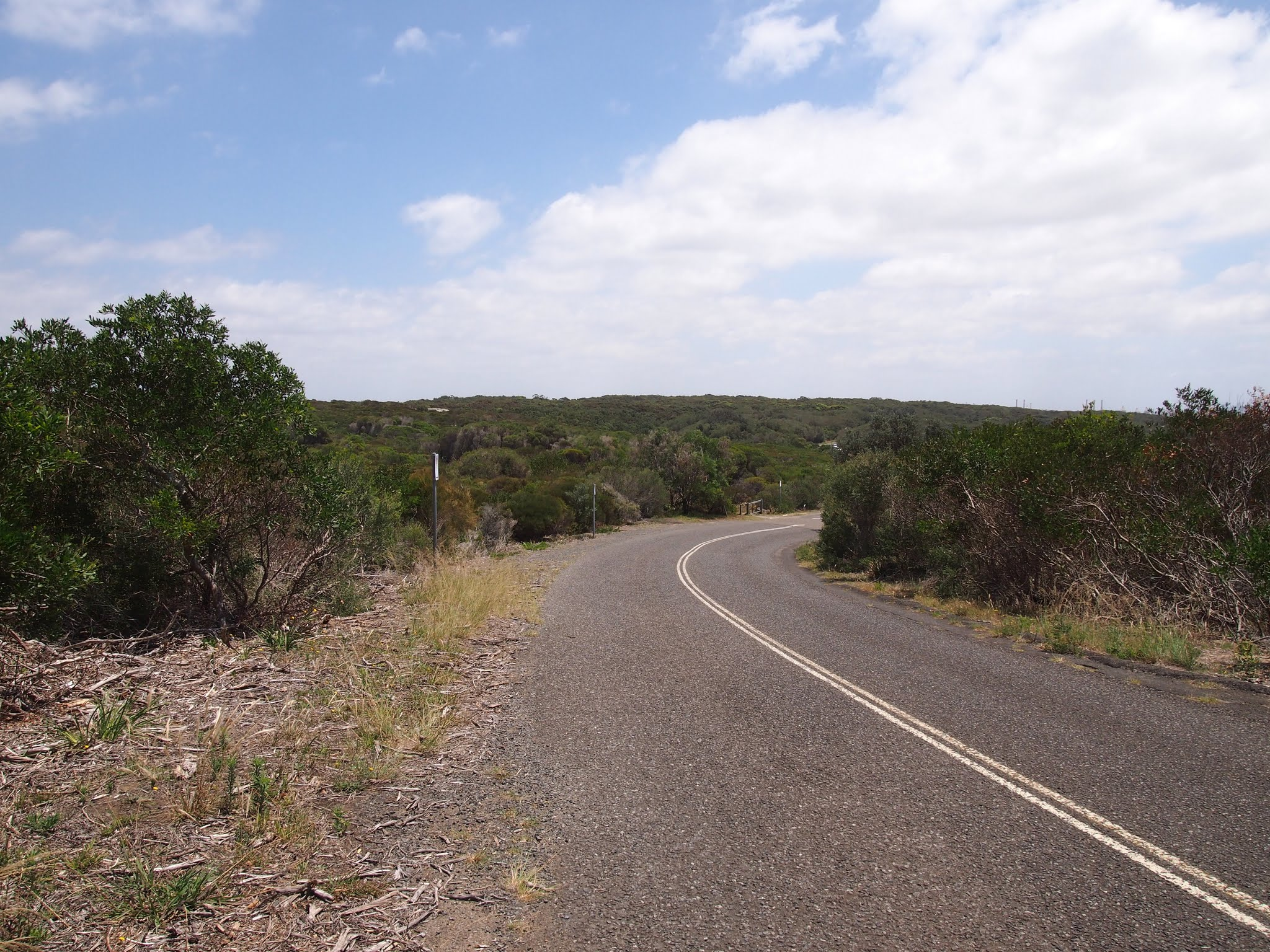
Heathland in Royal National Park, Sydney

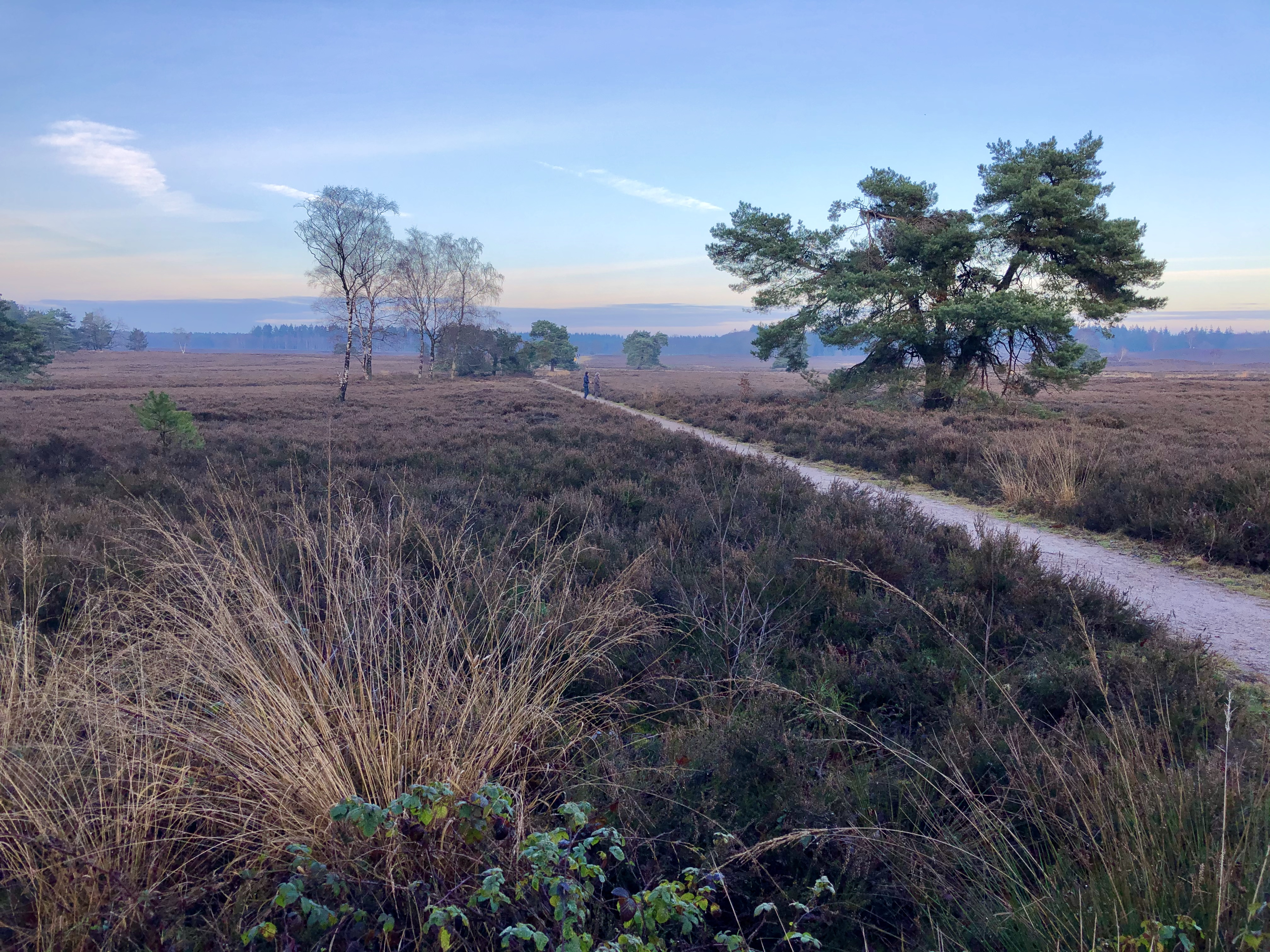
Heathland in the Veluwe forest, Netherlands

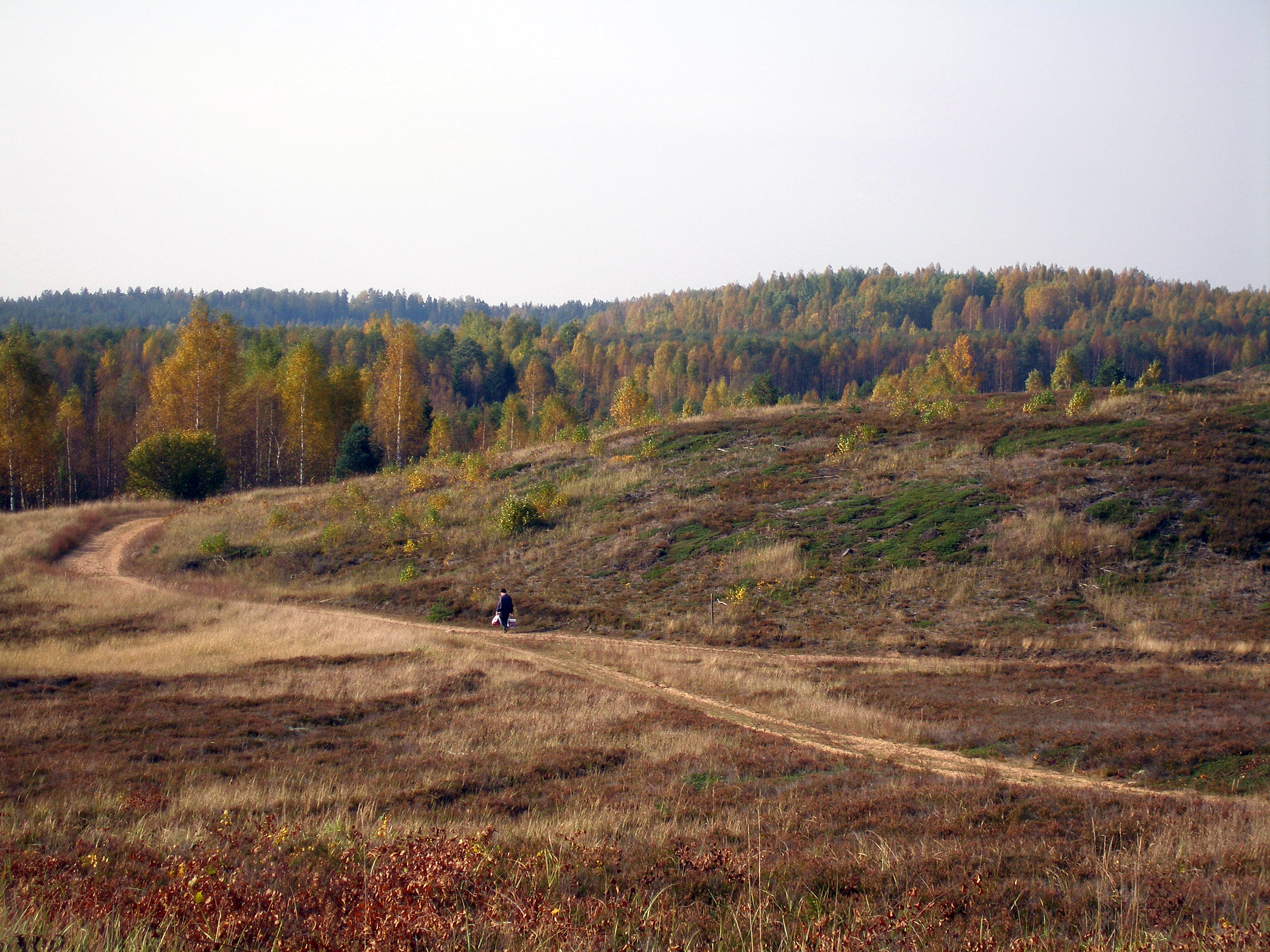
Heath in the Põhja-Kõrvemaa Nature Reserve in Estonia

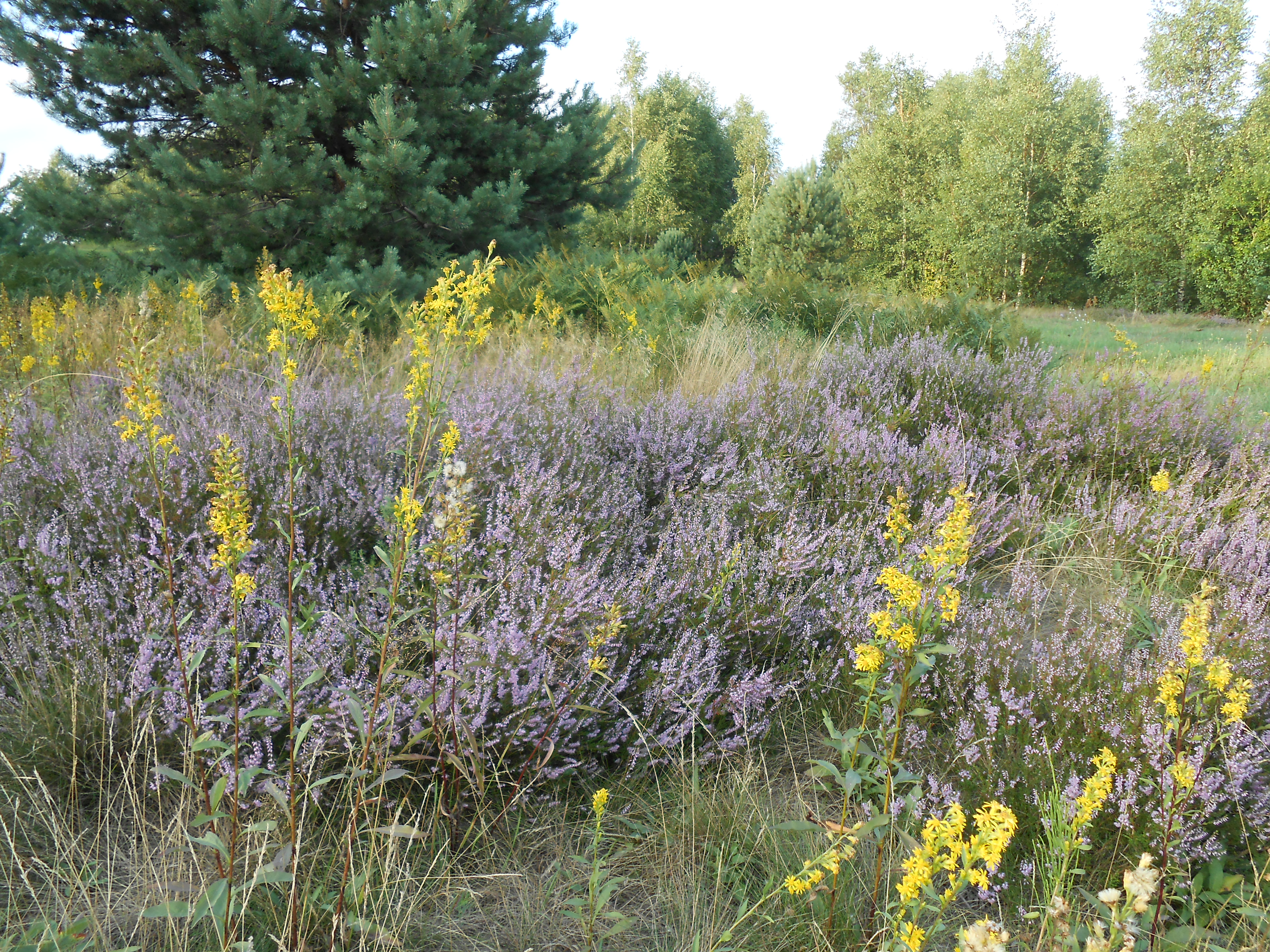
Heath on the Kraków-Częstochowa Upland in Poland

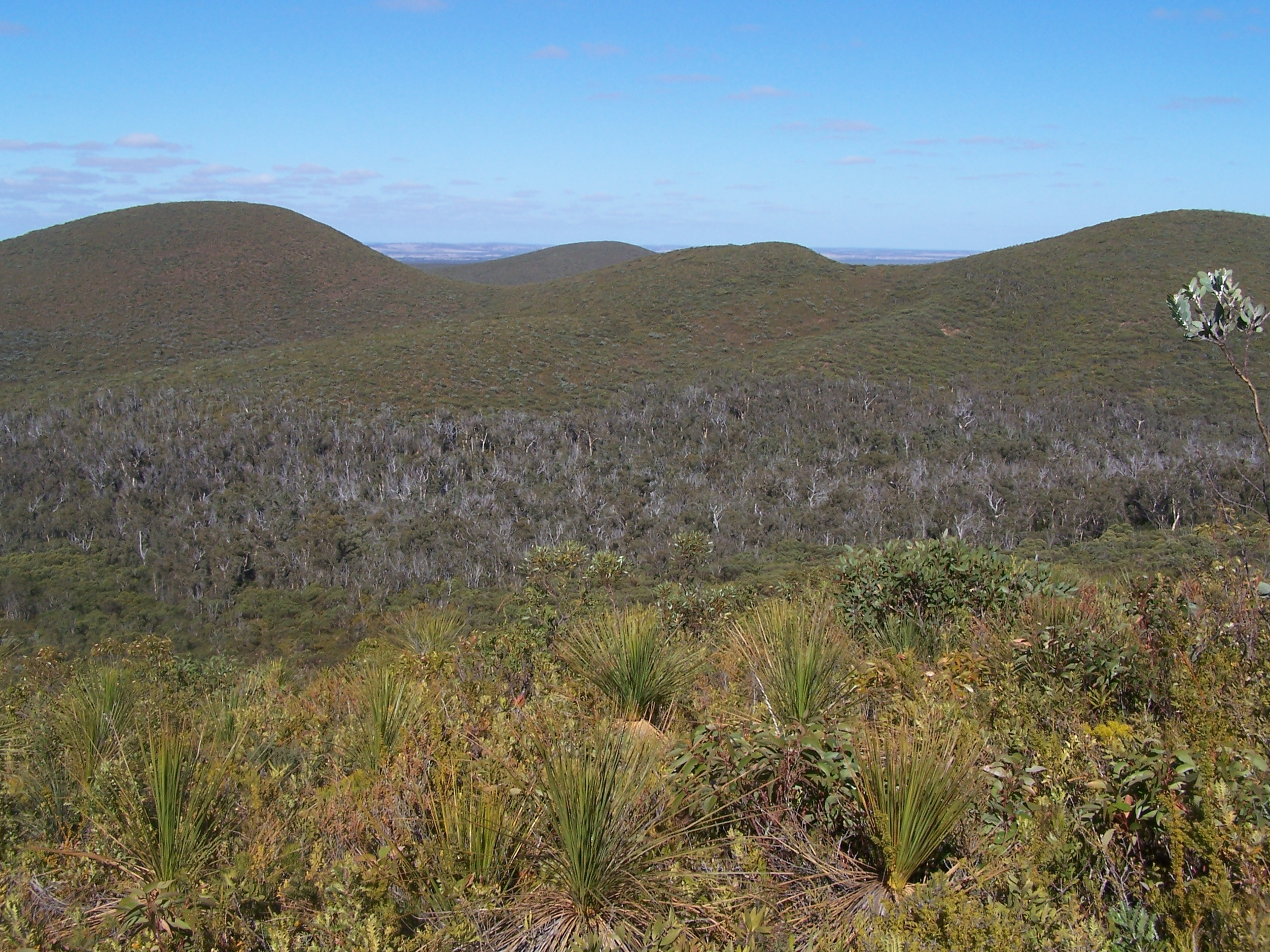
A heath landscape in the Stirling mountains of Western Australia, with a "dieback"-infested valley in the mid-ground

First Snow on Broughton Moor, 1890 oil painting by James Henry Crossland, depicting a heathland scene in the Lake District, England

== See also ==
- Bolster heath
- Chalk heath
- Garrigue
- Maquis shrubland
- Matorral
- Scrubland
