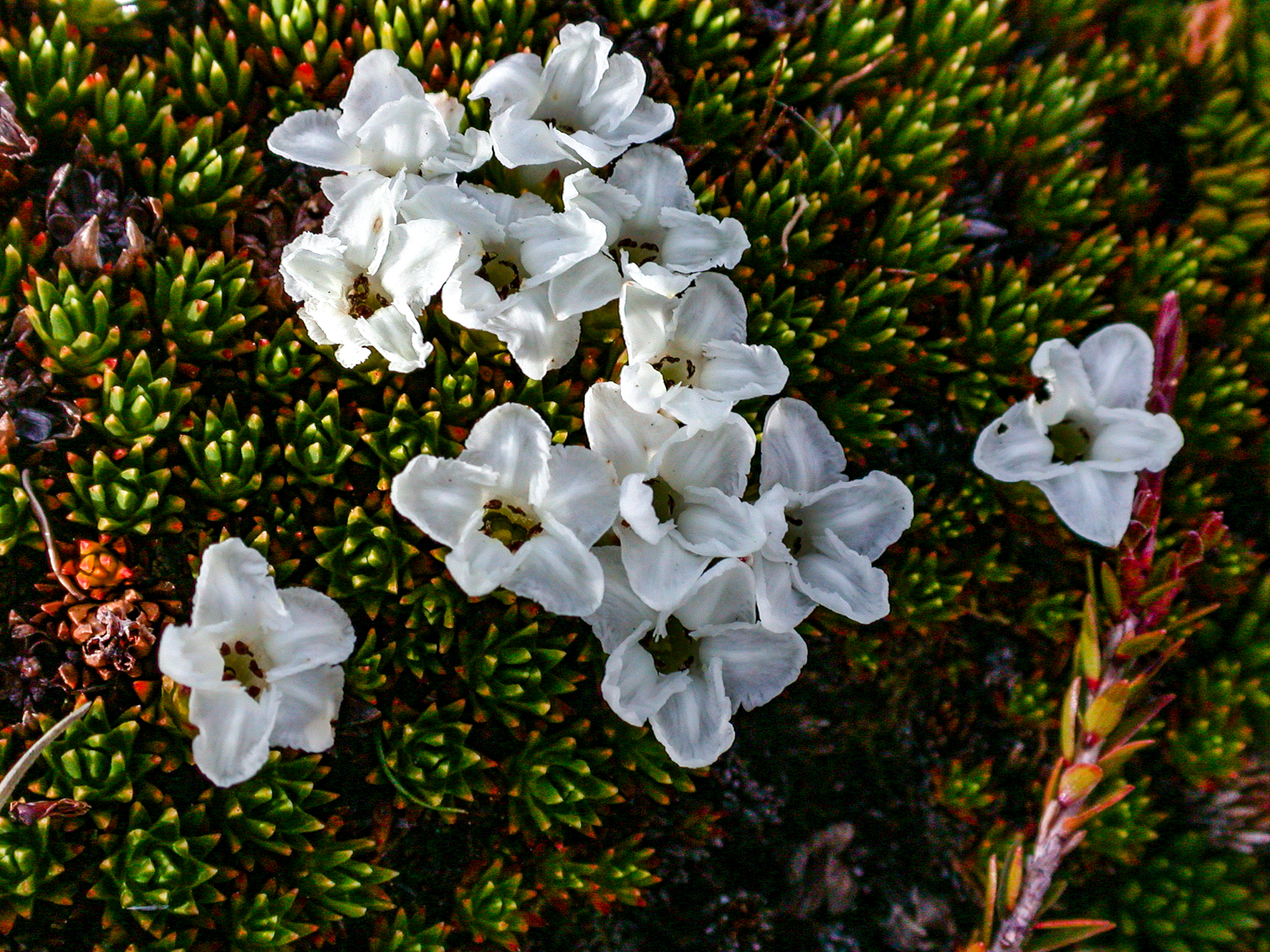
- Dracophyllum minimum in flower on Mount Field, 2021

Scientific classification
- Kingdom: Plantae
- Clade: Tracheophytes
- Clade: Angiosperms
- Clade: Eudicots
- Clade: Asterids
- Order: Ericales
- Family: Ericaceae
- Genus: Dracophyllum
- Species: D. minimum

Binomial name
- Dracophyllum minimum F.Muell.

= Dracophyllum minimum =

Species of plant

Dracophyllum minimum, commonly known as heath cushionplant or claspleaf heath, is a species of bolster cushion plant endemic to Tasmania, Australia. It is a low growing, highly compacted plant with white flowers, commonly found in alpine areas of the south, centre and west of Tasmania.

== Description ==
Dracophyllum minimum is a highly compacted cushion plant that grows close to the ground. It can form a large spreading mat, often interspersed with other cushion plant species such as Oreobolus pumilio, Abrotanella forsteroides, Donatia novae-zelandiae and Mitrasacme archeri. This undulating mat of mixed species is referred to as mosaic cushion heath. The leaves of D. minimum are bright green and sessile, with reddish tips and a broad sheathing base as long as the blade, approx 3 to 4 mm (0.12 to 0.16 in). The flowers are small, solitary, white, and tubular, sitting directly on top of the foliage. The plant can often be mistaken for the vegetatively similar cushion plants Abrotanella forsterioides and Donatia novae-zelandieae, however D. minimum is distinguished by its lack of a hairpoint on the leaf tip or hairy leaf axils. Cuchion plants are extremely slow growing and can occupy sites for a long period of time.

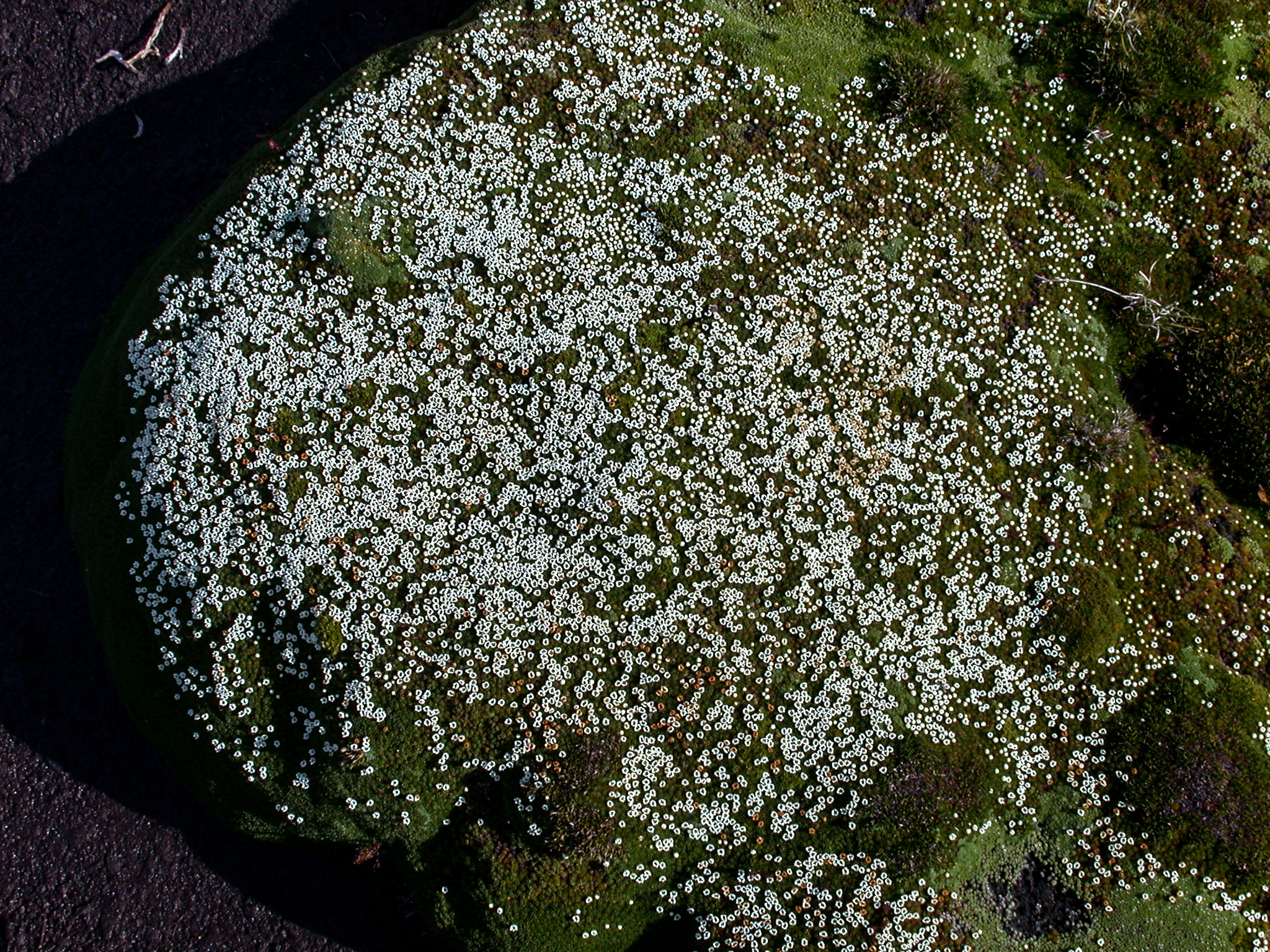
Flowering cushion of D. minimum on Mount Field

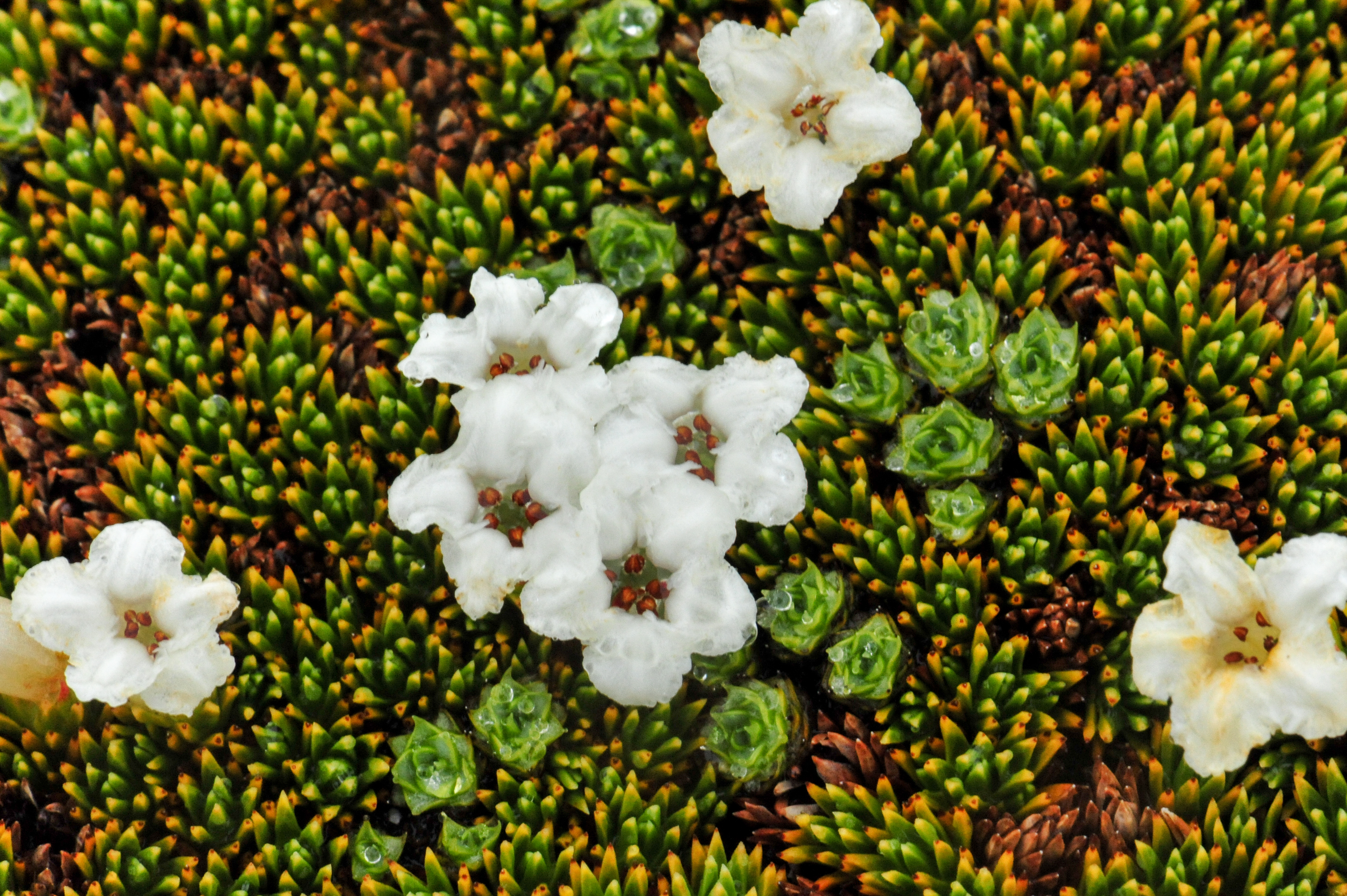
Flowering D. minimum with P. lawrencii growing in between on Mount Field

== Habitat ==
Dracophyllum minimum is endemic to Tasmania. It is commonly found in alpine regions of the south, centre and west of Tasmania, at altitudes above 1,200 m (3,900 ft), where snow may lie for several months of the year. It is generally found on shallow fibrous peaty soils with high rainfall and poor drainage. Dracophyllum minimum can grow individually, however it often occurs in cushion plant communities, consisting of a complex mix of cushion plant species, commonly 30 species/m^{2} (2.8 species/sq ft), forming an extensive undulating mat. These communities can spread up to several hectares in area.
