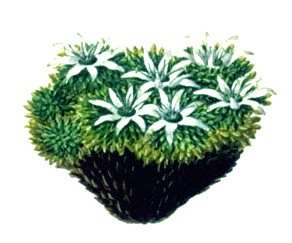
- Drawing of Donatia fascicularis from the Endeavour voyage of James Cook in 1769.

Scientific classification
- Kingdom: Plantae
- Clade: Tracheophytes
- Clade: Angiosperms
- Clade: Eudicots
- Clade: Asterids
- Order: Asterales
- Family: Stylidiaceae
- Genus: Donatia
- Species: D. fascicularis

Binomial name
- Donatia fascicularis J.R.Forst. & G.Forst.

= Donatia fascicularis =

Species of cushion plant

Donatia fascicularis is a species of cushion plant in the family Donatiaceae and is closely related to species in the family Stylidiaceae. It is found in the alpine and subalpine regions of western Patagonia and Tierra del Fuego. It is the type species of the genus Donatia J.R. Forst. & G. Forst.

Although first collected in 1769 during the first voyage of James Cook, and painted at that time by the on-board artist Sydney Parkinson, the genus and species were not validly published until 1776, by Johann Reinhold Forster and his son Georg, following the second voyage.

In Chile Donatia fascicularis is, together with Astelia pumila, dominant in the cushion bogs that exists in areas exposed to the Pacific coast. As such it is not usually found together with Sphagnum which tend to grow slightly more inland.
