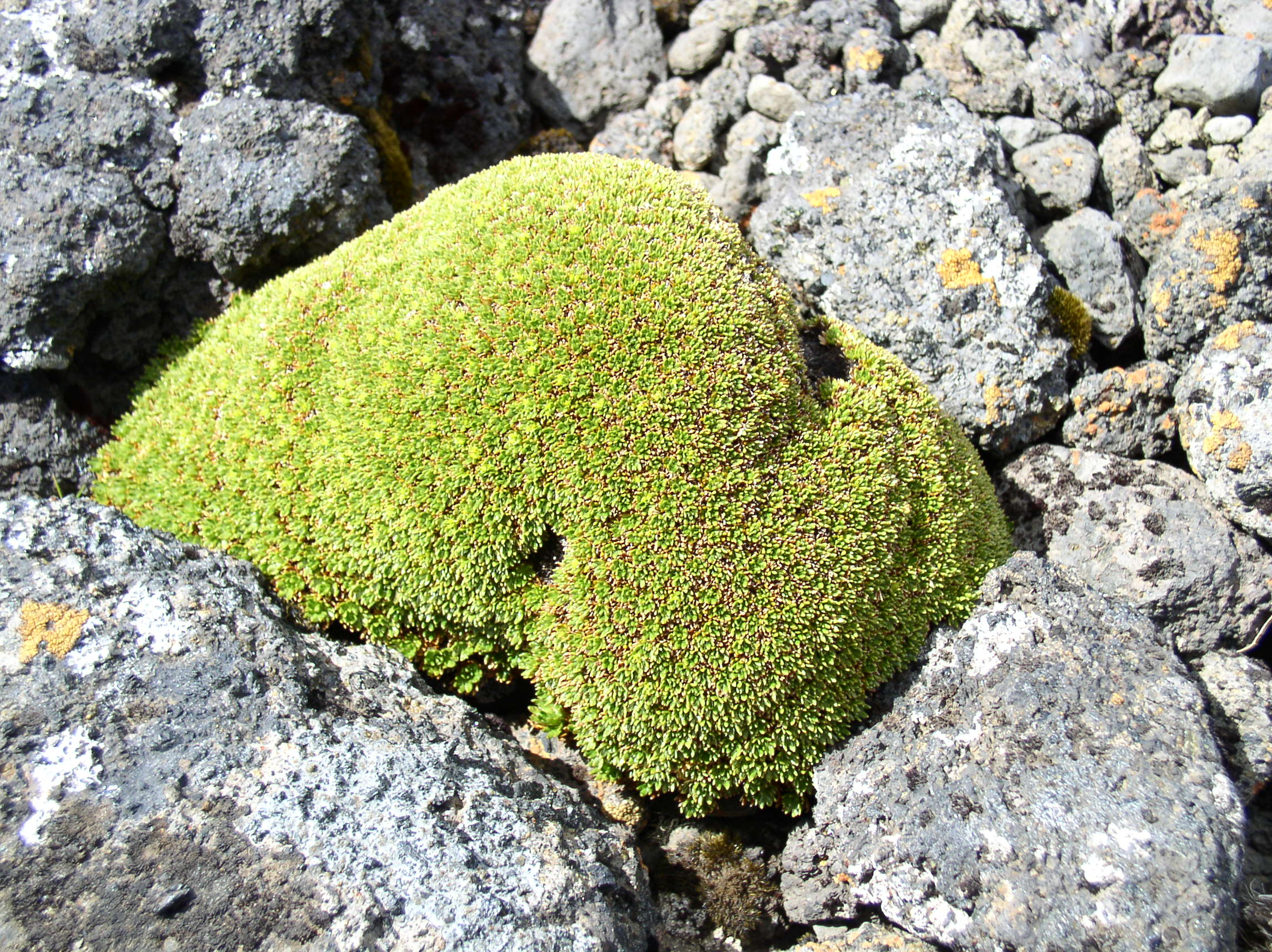

Scientific classification
- Kingdom: Plantae
- Clade: Tracheophytes
- Clade: Angiosperms
- Clade: Eudicots
- Clade: Asterids
- Order: Apiales
- Family: Apiaceae
- Genus: Azorella
- Species: A. selago

Binomial name
- Azorella selago Hook.f.

= Azorella selago =

Species of flowering plant

Azorella selago is a species of cushion plant native to the sub-Antarctic islands of the Southern Ocean, including the Crozet Islands, the Possession Islands, the Heard Island and McDonald Islands, the Kerguelen Islands, and the Prince Edward Islands. The closely related Azorella macquariensis, which is endemic to Macquarie Island, was split from it taxonomically in 1989. A. selago is often a keystone species where it occurs and is well studied for its contribution to its native ecosystems.
