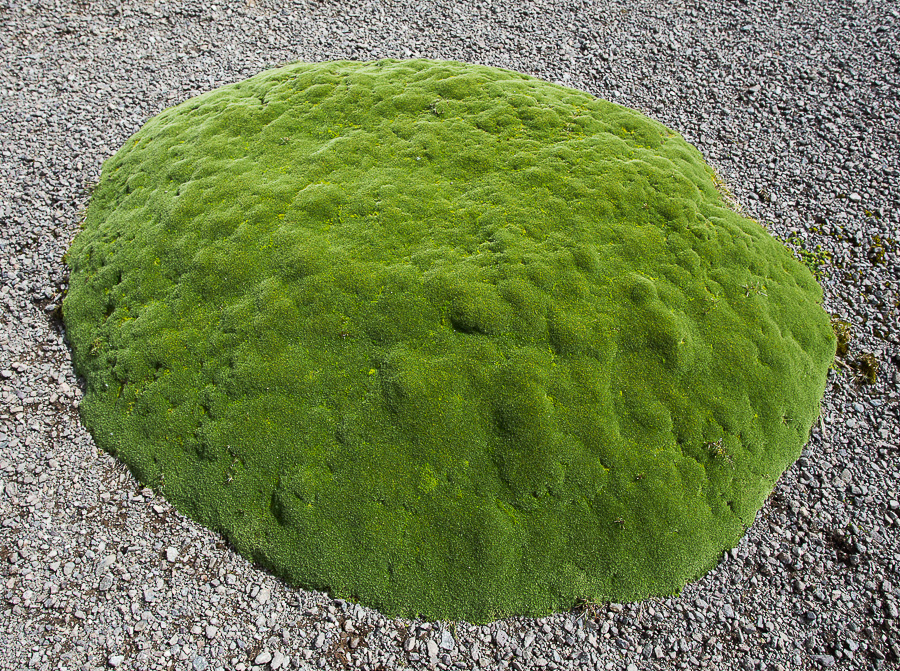
- Azorella macquariensis cushion plant on Macquarie Island.

Conservation status
- Critically endangered (EPBC Act)

Scientific classification
- Kingdom: Plantae
- Clade: Tracheophytes
- Clade: Angiosperms
- Clade: Eudicots
- Clade: Asterids
- Order: Apiales
- Family: Apiaceae
- Genus: Azorella
- Species: A. macquariensis

Binomial name
- Azorella macquariensis Orchard, 1989

= Azorella macquariensis =

Species of flowering plant

Azorella macquariensis, also known as Macquarie azorella or Macquarie cushions, is a species of cushion plant endemic to Australia’s subantarctic Macquarie Island. It was referred to the more widely distributed Azorella selago until 1989, when it was described as a separate species.

== Description ==
Azorella macquariensis is a perennial cushion-forming herb. Individuals form cushions and mats that may vary in size from a few centimetres to several metres in diameter and up to 60 cm in height. It is a keystone species dominating Macquarie's feldmark habitat, in which it is the only vascular plant, forming a major structural component of the vegetation. The feldmark community covers about half the island in the most wind-exposed areas of the plateau some 200–400 m above sea level. The plant flowers from December to February and fruits from January to April. It turns brown and ceases to grow during winter (from June to August).

== Conservation status ==
Azorella macquariensis has suffered a catastrophic decline due to dieback from unknown causes, first noticed in December 2008, and is considered to be endangered. As of August 2010 it is listed as critically endangered under the EPBC Act.
