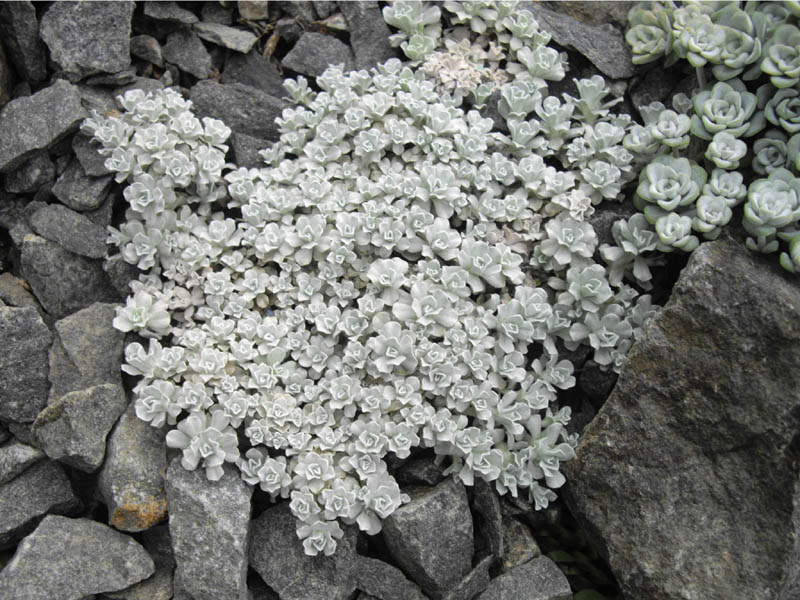

Scientific classification
- Kingdom: Plantae
- Clade: Embryophytes
- Clade: Tracheophytes
- Clade: Angiosperms
- Clade: Eudicots
- Clade: Asterids
- Order: Asterales
- Family: Asteraceae
- Genus: Ewartia
- Species: E. planchonii

Binomial name
- Ewartia planchonii Beauverd

= Ewartia planchonii =

Species of flowering plant

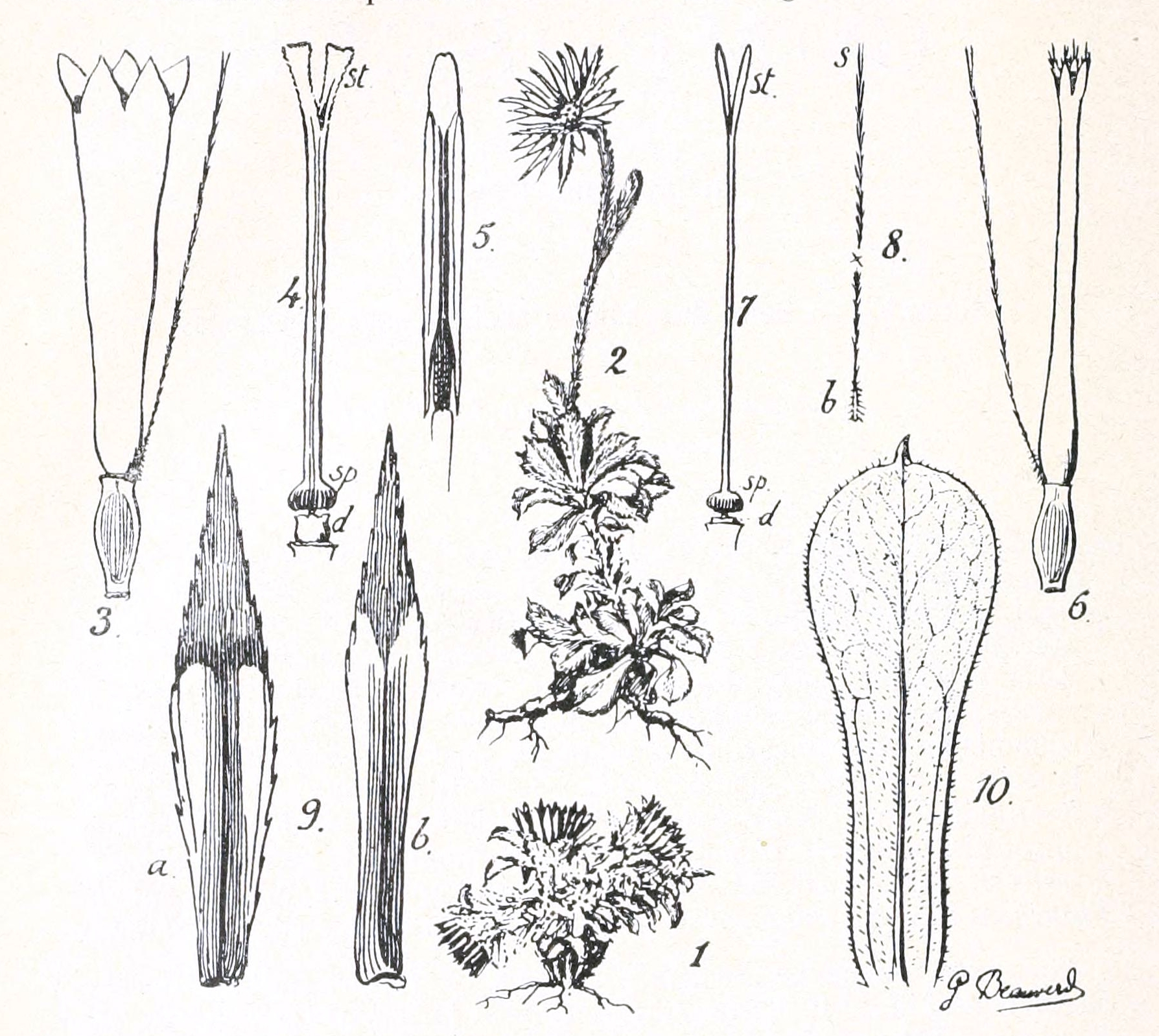
illustration of Ewartia planchonii in Beauverd (1911)

Ewartia planchonii, commonly known as creeping cushionherb, is an endemic herb to alpine areas of Tasmania. E. planchonii is commonly found in the western highlands of Tasmania. The Ewartia genus is described as cushion plants/herbs due to the characteristic growth habits of low growing, highly compact mats which are made up of highly packed stems. These mats are slow-growing and are often located in soils that contain low nutrients.

== Description ==
Ewartia planchonii is a sprawling herb which forms mat-like ground coverage over rocky alpine landscapes. Leaves are densely tufted, overlapping along the stem, obovately shaped and 3-6mm long.

The leaves are also covered by soft hairs which whiten with age. Flowerheads are ovoid in shape and open up flat to 7-8mm long, brownish/ yellow and lack the usual petal-like bracts. Flowering occurs over the summer months to increase chances of pollination.

== Habitat and distribution ==
Commonly found in locations of alpine/subalpine Tasmania, on exposed mountain slopes at around 1300m. E. planchonii's common vegetation type is microshrubbery/ herbfield being characterised by species which grow less than 10 cm in height but consists of a high species abundance. The plants which live in these habitats must be able to survive in high winds and temporary snow cover as well as high UV radiation during summer months. Soil of these habitats often contains peat to a shallow depth.

Distribution of E. planchonii is mainly over the western province of Tasmania which outlying populations located in the Ben Lomond National Park in the states north east and Mt Wellington/ kunanyi close to Hobart.

== Threats and conservation ==
Habitat of E. planchonii is widely protected in reserves and national parks across the state of Tasmania, but its main threat currently is the changing climate. Species in alpine areas are vulnerable to the advancing treeline, higher fire risk to peatlands due to the increase of dry lightning events and less annual rainfall. Increased distribution data and population monitoring will be crucial to facilitating the future conservation of this species.

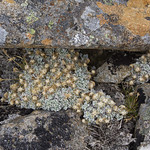
Flowering E. planchonii, post seed dispersal, found above Pine lake, Central Plateau Tasmania.

== Affinities ==
There are 6 known species in the Ewartia genus. E. capites, E. meredithae and E. planchonii are all endemic to alpine areas of Tasmania. Whereas E. capites and E. argentifolia are found on the mainland of Australia. Differently E. sinclairi is endemic to the south island of New Zealand, while also preferring an alpine habitat, sinclairi grows to a sub-shrub height of 20-40 cm. E. capites is often located in the same regions as E. planchonii throughout Tasmania yet is known to flower later in summer than planchonii.
