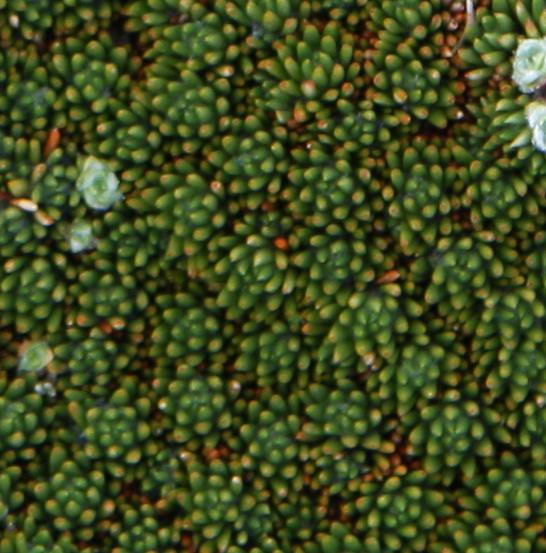

Scientific classification
- Kingdom: Plantae
- Clade: Embryophytes
- Clade: Tracheophytes
- Clade: Spermatophytes
- Clade: Angiosperms
- Clade: Eudicots
- Clade: Asterids
- Order: Asterales
- Family: Asteraceae
- Genus: Abrotanella
- Species: A. forsteroides

Binomial name
- Abrotanella forsteroides (Hook.f.) Benth.

Synonyms
- Scleroleima forsteroides Hook.f.

= Abrotanella forsteroides =

Species of plant

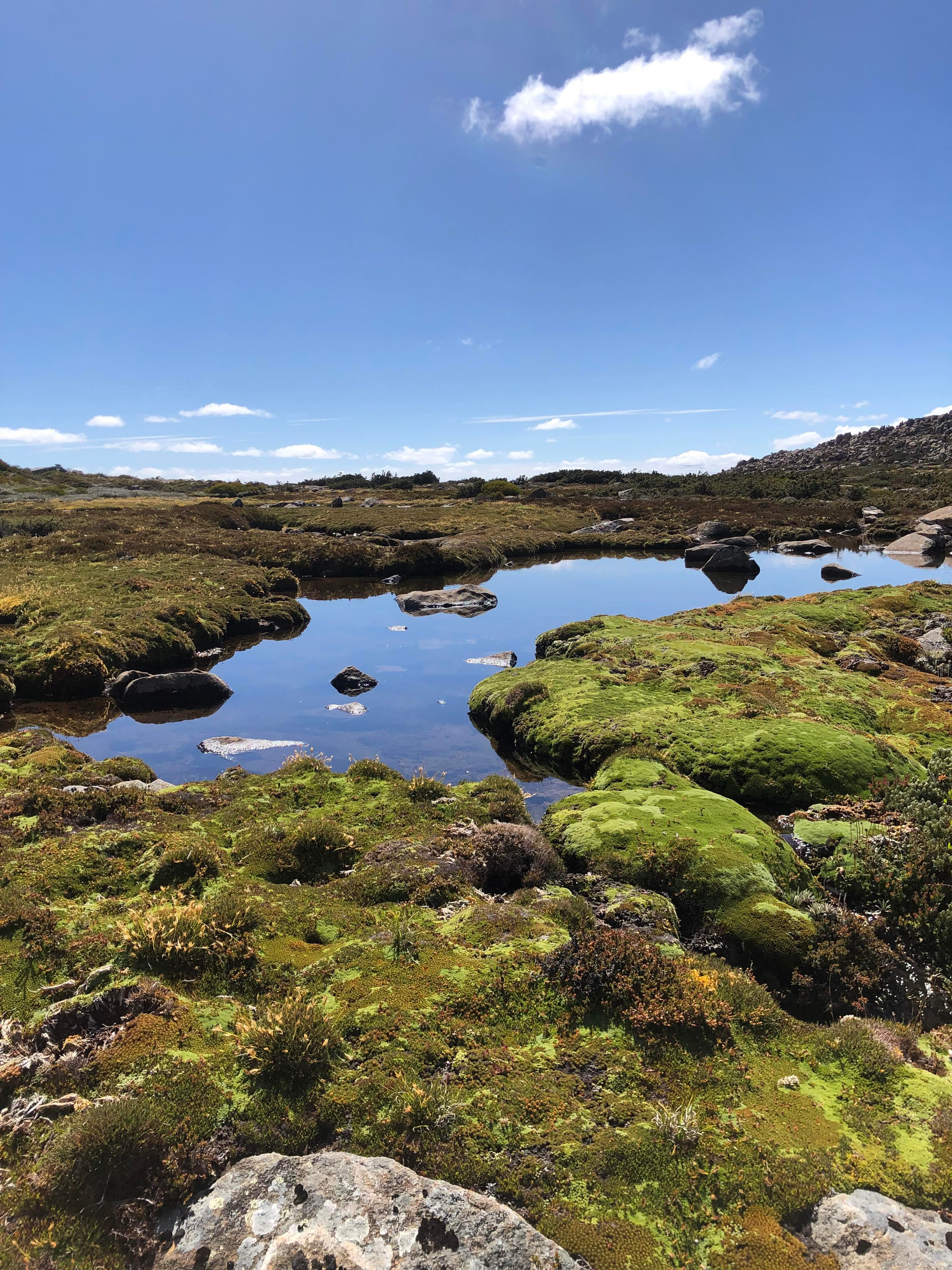
Cushion plant moorland - Mt. Field, Tasmania.

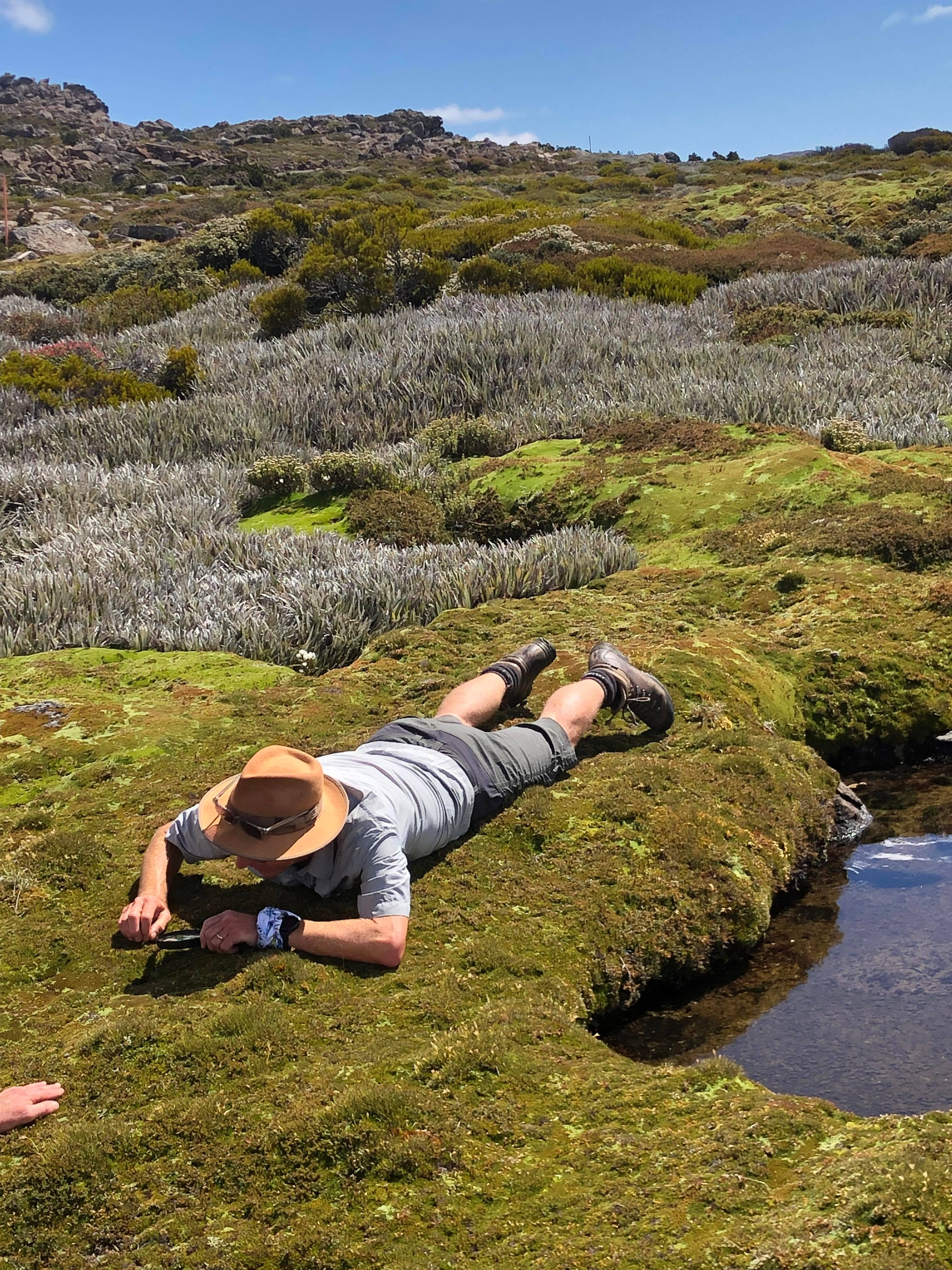
Safe assessment of cushion plant communities (weight distributed evenly) in Mt. Field, Tasmania.

Abrotanella forsteroides, commonly known as the Tasmanian cushion plant, is an angiosperm endemic to Tasmania, Australia. The plant is a dicot species in the daisy family Asteraceae and can be identified by its bright green and compact cushion-like appearance.

The term cushion plant refers to a characteristic growth habit adopted by a variety of species and families growing in alpine and subalpine environments. The growth habit is an adaptation to low nutrient areas and typically involves deep tap roots and densely-packed stems, which decay to form a layer of peat under the plants. This dense growth pattern provides insulating properties to the plant, preventing root exposure to sub-zero temperatures, and forms a mat- or cushion-like structure.

== Description ==
A herbaceous perennial, the plant is low growing, woody, compact and spreads in mat-like manner to 3 metres (10 ft) in diameter. The large mat is commonly interspersed with other cushion plant species such as Dracophyllum minimum and Donatia novae-zelandiae. The leaves are bright green, thick, crowded and sheathing from the base to a pointed tip with a single fine hair, the blades 2 millimetres (1/8 in) long. Flowering occurs from December–February. The flowers are small, solitary, tubular and white, positioned above the foliage.

=== Similar species ===
Abrotanella forsteroides is commonly mistaken for Dracophyllum minimum and Donatia novae-zelandieae due to their vegetatively similar appearances. However, D. minimum is distinguished by its reddish leaf tips and lack of hair and D. novae-zelandiae is distinguished by the presence of hairy leaf axils.

== Distribution and habitat ==
Abrotanella forsteroides is commonly found in alpine and sub-alpine regions of Tasmania above 1,200 metres (3,900 ft). The plant is widespread in screes and alpine moors, and forms mosaics with other cushion plants. It typically occupies areas with high rainfall and poorly drained, shallow fibrous peaty soils.

== Sensitivity ==
Cushion plants are extremely sensitive to being trampled on by bushwalkers due to their slow growing nature.
