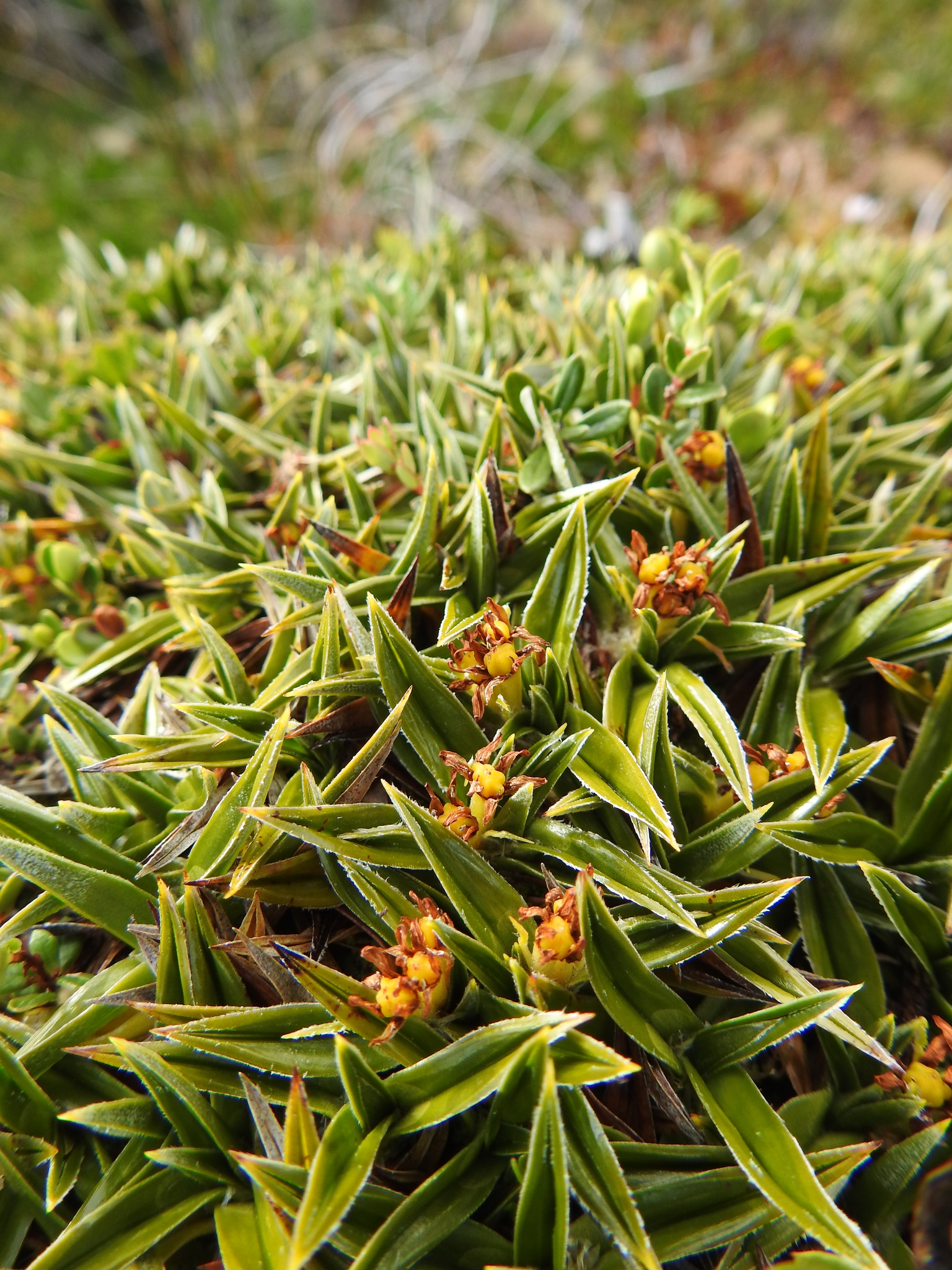

Scientific classification
- Kingdom: Plantae
- Clade: Tracheophytes
- Clade: Angiosperms
- Clade: Monocots
- Order: Asparagales
- Family: Asteliaceae
- Genus: Astelia
- Species: A. pumila

Binomial name
- Astelia pumila (J.R.Forst.) Gaudich.

Synonyms
- Melanthium pumilum J.R.Forst.

= Astelia pumila =

Species of flowering plant

Astelia pumila is a species of flowering plant in the recently named family Asteliaceae. It is an evergreen silver-green perennial from western Patagonia in southern Chile and nearby areas of Argentina. It grows in forests as well as wetlands. The plant is, together with Donatia fascicularis, dominant in the cushion bogs that exists in areas exposed to the Pacific coast. As such, it does not usually occur together with Sphagnum which tends to grow slightly more inland. Localities where the plant is found include, from north to south; Queulat National Park, Chonos Archipelago, Taitao Peninsula, San Rafael Lake, the vicinities of Caleta Tortel and Tierra del Fuego National Park.
