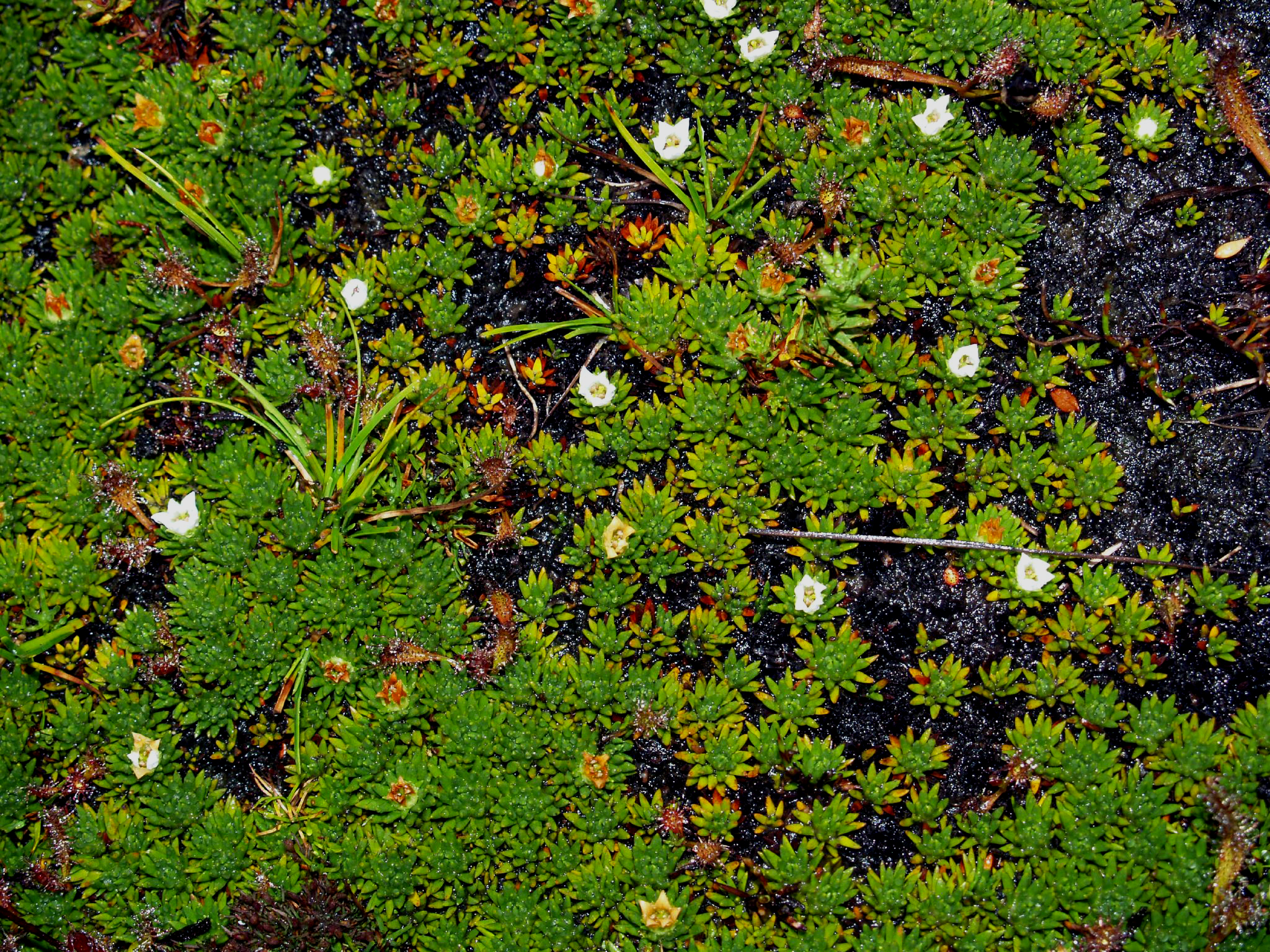
- Donatia novae-zelandiae

Scientific classification
- Kingdom: Plantae
- Clade: Tracheophytes
- Clade: Angiosperms
- Clade: Eudicots
- Clade: Asterids
- Order: Asterales
- Family: Stylidiaceae
- Subfamily: Donatioideae; B.Chandler
- Genus: Donatia; J.R.Forst. & G.Forst.

Type species
- Donatia fascicularis

Species
- Donatia fascicularis; Donatia novae-zelandiae

= Donatia =

Genus of flowering plants

Donatia is a genus of two cushion plant species in the family Stylidiaceae. The name commemorates Vitaliano Donati, an Italian botanist.

Donatia has been placed in the subfamily Donatioideae, described by Johannes Mildbraed in his 1908 taxonomic monograph of the family Stylidiaceae. The subfamily was created to distinguish the difference between the single genus Donatia from the five typical genera of the Stylidiaceae that Mildbraed placed in the Stylidioideae subfamily. The subfamily taxonomy represented the taxonomic uncertainty of Donatia, which had at one point also been placed in the Saxifragaceae. Donatia differs sufficiently from the genera in the Stylidiaceae in that it has free stamens and petals, paracytic stomata, and a pollen morphology distinct from the other genera. Because of this and the recent phylogenetic analysis based on rbcL genes, more recent treatments have segregated Donatia into its own family, the Donatiaceae. The molecular phylogenetic analysis has placed Donatia as a sister-group to Stylidiaceae, thus leaving the Stylidiaceae as a monophyletic family.

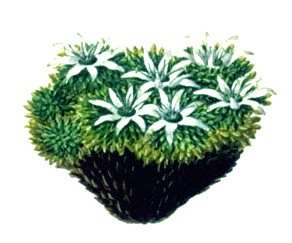
Drawing of Donatia fascicularis from the Endeavour voyage of James Cook in 1769.

As early as three years after Mildbraed's publication of the subfamily Donatioideae, other authors began to question the placement and argued for recognition of Donatiaceae. In 1915, Carl Skottsberg formally published the Donatiaceae. The APG II system recommended the inclusion of Donatia in Stylidiaceae but allowed for the optional recognition of the family Donatiaceae. The APG III system merges Donatiaceae into Stylidiaceae. The two species in the genus represent a wide geographic range. D. novae-zelandiae is found in the alpine and subalpine regions of New Zealand and Tasmania while D. fascicularis is native to similar habitats in southern South America to latitude 40°S.

In Chile Donatia fascicularis is, together with Astelia pumila, dominant in the cushion bogs that exists in areas exposed to the Pacific coast. As such it is not usually found together with Sphagnum which tend to grow slightly more inland.
