= Mount Field West (Tasmania) =

Mountain in Tasmania, Australia

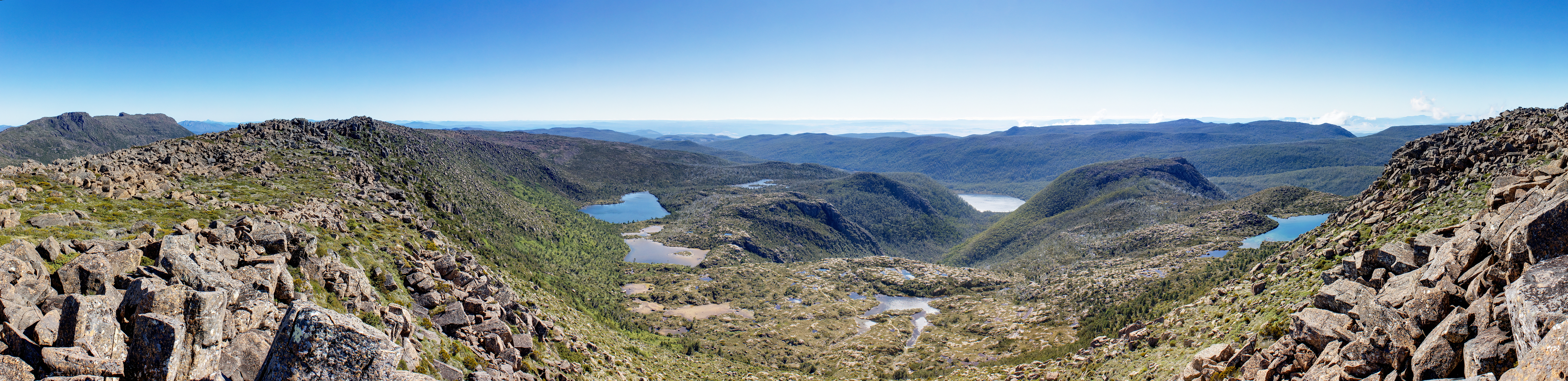
- Mount Field West is the peak on the far left

Highest point
- Elevation: 1,434 m (4,705 ft)AHD
- Prominence: 981 m (3,219 ft)
- Isolation: 68.92 km (42.82 mi)
- Coordinates: 42°39′19″S 146°35′15″E

Geography
- Location within Tasmania
- Location: Tasmania, Australia

Mount Field West is a mountain in the western portion of Mount Field National Park in the southern region of Tasmania, Australia.

The mountain is frequently snow-covered, sometimes even in summer. It is a major feature of the national park, and is a popular destination for bushwalkers. It overlooks Upper Florentine Valley and is a 7.5 hour return walk from Lake Dobson.

Mount Field West rises to 1,434 metres (4,705 ft) above sea level, making it within the forty highest peaks in Tasmania.

== See also ==
- List of highest mountains of Tasmania
