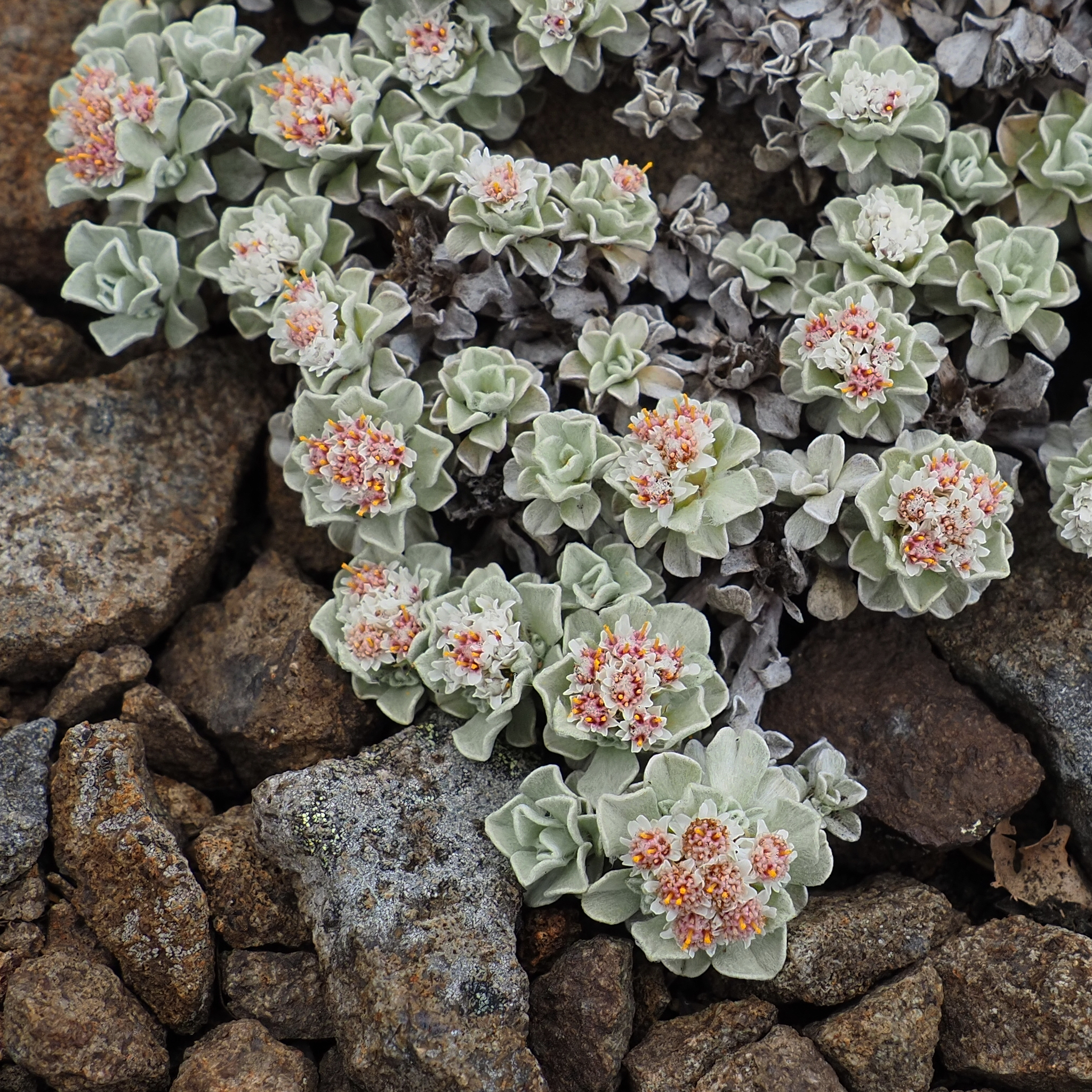

Scientific classification
- Kingdom: Plantae
- Clade: Tracheophytes
- Clade: Angiosperms
- Clade: Eudicots
- Clade: Asterids
- Order: Asterales
- Family: Asteraceae
- Genus: Ewartia
- Species: E. catipes

Binomial name
- Ewartia catipes (DC.) Beauverd

= Ewartia catipes =

Species of flowering plant

Ewartia catipes is a species of Ewartia. The plant's natural habitat is on eastern facing slopes in Tasmania. It is a rusty brown color and grows to around 10 centimeters long.
