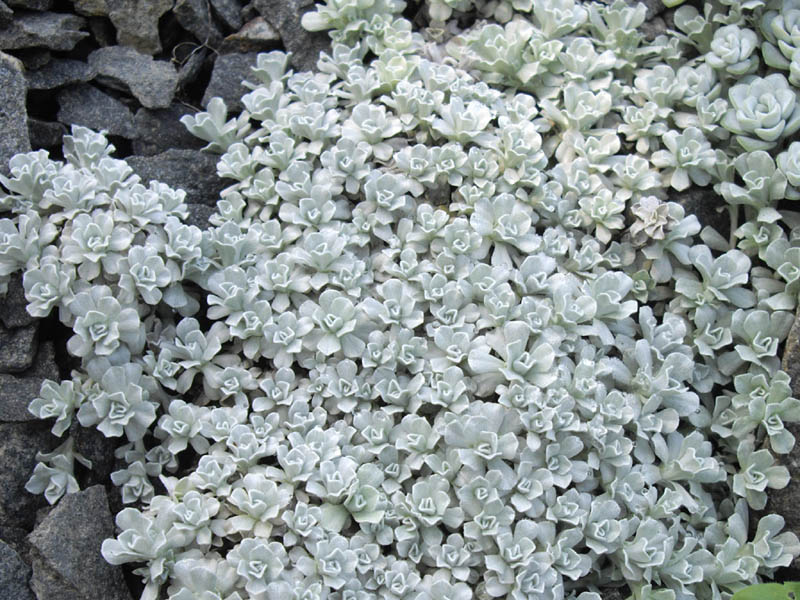
- Ewartia planchonii

Scientific classification
- Kingdom: Plantae
- Clade: Tracheophytes
- Clade: Angiosperms
- Clade: Eudicots
- Clade: Asterids
- Order: Asterales
- Family: Asteraceae
- Subfamily: Asteroideae
- Tribe: Gnaphalieae
- Genus: Ewartia; Beauverd

= Ewartia (plant) =

Genus of daisies

Ewartia is a genus of flowering plants in the family Asteraceae native to New Zealand and Australia. It is named after a 20th-century botanist and plant collector named Alfred James Ewart.

Species

- Ewartia catipes (Australia)
- Ewartia meredithiae (Australia)
- Ewartia nubigena (Australia)
- Ewartia planchonii (Australia)
