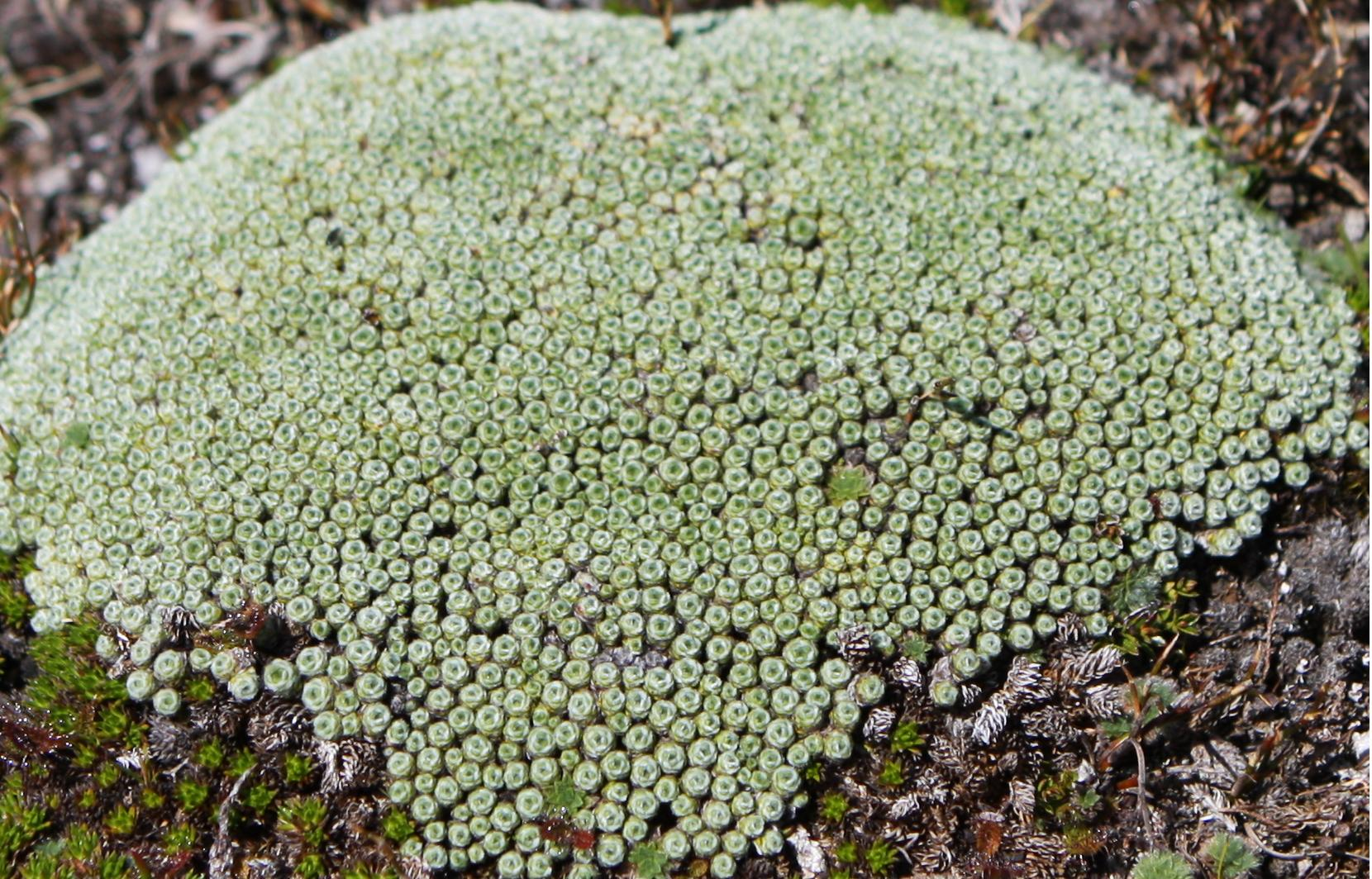

Scientific classification
- Kingdom: Plantae
- Clade: Tracheophytes
- Clade: Angiosperms
- Clade: Eudicots
- Clade: Asterids
- Order: Asterales
- Family: Asteraceae
- Subfamily: Asteroideae
- Tribe: Gnaphalieae
- Genus: Pterygopappus; Hook.f.
- Species: P. lawrencii

Binomial name
- Pterygopappus lawrencii Hook.f.

Synonyms
- Gnaphalium sect. Pterygopappus (Hook.f.) Baill.; Pterygopappus lawrencei Hook.f., alternate spelling

= Pterygopappus =

Genus of plants

Pterygopappus is a genus of flowering plants in the tribe Gnaphalieae within the family Asteraceae. There is only one known species, Pterygopappus lawrencii (sage cushion plant), which is endemic to alpine Tasmania. It forms thick, light blue/green mats with densely packed leaves. It is most common in the mountains of the northeastern part of the island. It is a slow grower and prefers cool, moist environments.

== Description ==
Pterygopappus lawrencii has a noticeably tufted habit and is easily identified by its sage-green leaves which are no more than 5 mm long. These leaves are tightly congested and can be said to resemble a small cabbage or rose. They are covered in very fine, small and white hairs. Beneath the tightly grouped sets of leaves, stems elongate at a rate which is equal to the rate at which new leaves are produced. It is therefore difficult to identify which leaves are connected to which stem. This is the main method for how this species spreads across the alpine landscape. From the centre of the small ‘rosette’ emerges a white, small daisy like flower between December- March. The fruit of this species is an achene.

== Habitat and distribution ==
Pterygopappus lawrencii is found in montane heathlands, alpine vegetation areas and wet screes. It is distributed mostly across the east of Tasmania especially in the Central Plateau areas of Mount Field National Park and Cradle Mountain National Park. The habitat of the species displays the hardiness of the plant. It is ideally found in areas with a thin and peaty soil, the product of heavily eroded dolerite and siliceous bedrock, where most of the soil has been removed by glacial processes. It is also constantly exposed to high winds, snow and low temperatures It is unusual to find an area of P. lawrencii growing as a monoculture as they most often occur within a mosaic of other cushion plant species such as Donatia novae-zelandiae, Dracophyllum minimum, Abrotanella forsteroides and Schizacme archeri. This ability to grow extremely close and integrate with other cushion plant species is part of the reason for their success in these trying conditions. The tightly packed leaves enable a reasonably constant temperature to be maintained at the core of the plant, and their low and spreading nature enables them to miss the worst of the wind sweep.

== Ecological importance ==
The species can be described as an engineering or foundation species, due to its ability to create tarns and small rivers in alpine areas. Collectively, cushion plants promote species richness. They have been found to attract a greater diversity of species in alpine areas compared to non-cushion plants, provide both refuge for arthropods as well as a pollination resource for insects.

== Threats ==
One of the major threats to alpine vegetation is fire, although this is a species which is able to recover from fire reasonably well. However, foot traffic from bushwalkers greatly damages these plants, especially in very wet or waterlogged areas. Damaged plants may take up to 10 years to fully recover, in which time erosion is increased due to lack of soil stability created by these plants. Insects and arthropods which depend upon these species for food and refuge may also decrease in these areas.
