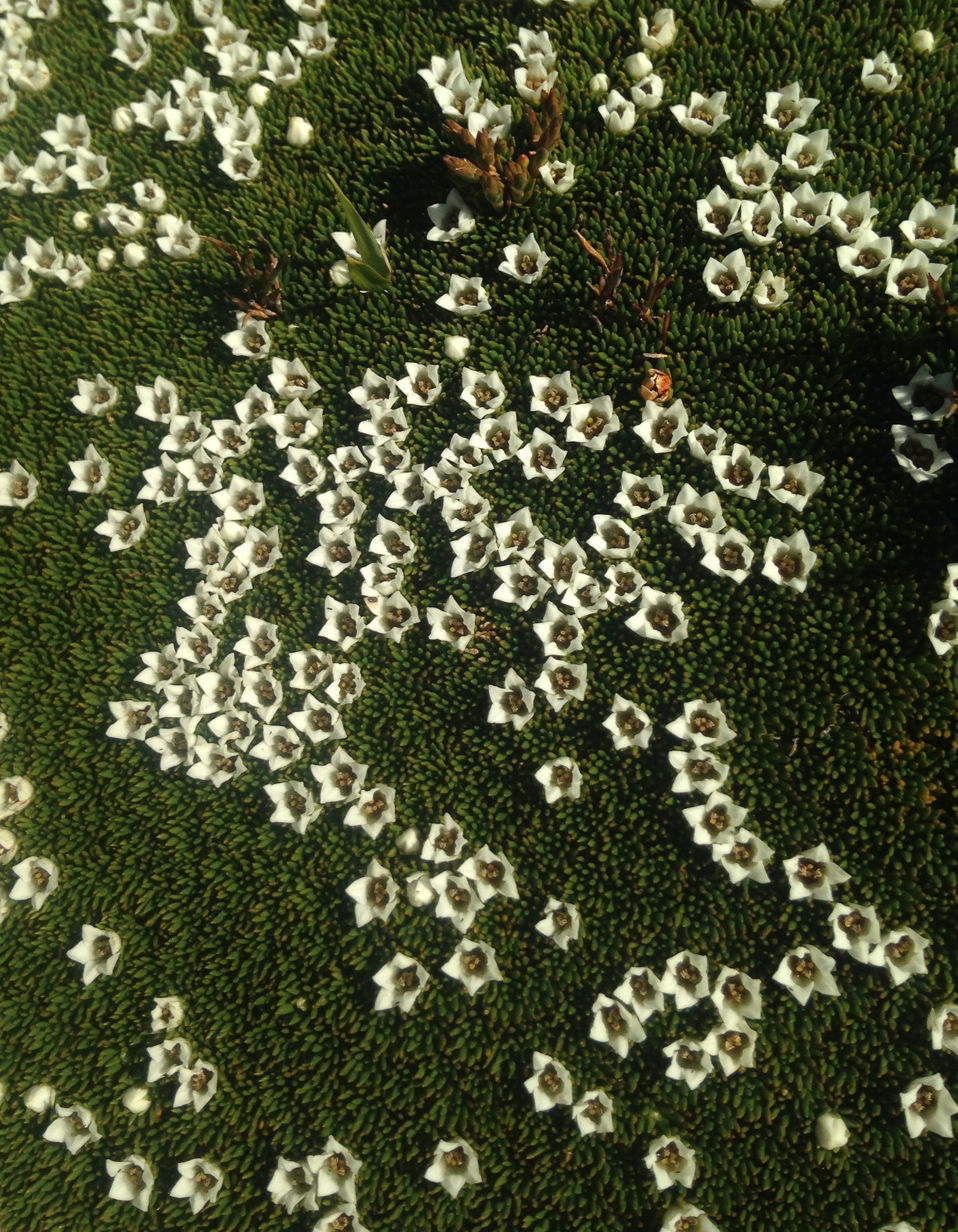

Scientific classification
- Kingdom: Plantae
- Clade: Tracheophytes
- Clade: Angiosperms
- Clade: Eudicots
- Clade: Asterids
- Order: Asterales
- Family: Stylidiaceae
- Genus: Donatia
- Species: D. novae-zelandiae

Binomial name
- Donatia novae-zelandiae Hook.f.

= Donatia novae-zelandiae =

Species of flowering plant

Donatia novae-zelandiae is a species of mat-forming cushion plant, found only in New Zealand and Tasmania. Common names can include New Zealand cushion or snow cushion, however snow cushion also refers to Iberis sempervirens. Donatia novae-zelandiae forms dense spirals of thick, leathery leaves, creating a hardy plant that typically exists in alpine and subalpine bioclimatic zones.

Donatia novae-zelandiae is one of two species in the genus Donatia, which is the only genus in the family Donatiaceae.

== Description ==
Donatia novae-zelandiae is a perennial plant that forms a mat capable of reaching over a meter in diameter, made up of densely packed tufts tipped with imbricated spirals of leaves, all connected by one root system. Leaves are sessile, base widened, 5-6mm long and erect. Upper leaves are bright green, while lower leaves are brown, but still long persisting. In the leaf axils are 2-3mm long, tufts of dense white hairs. Stomata are apparent, running parallel along the main axis on both leaf surfaces, with their guard cells being surrounded by a distinctive circular ridge. Flowers are white, 5-6mm wide, solitary and scattered across the surface of the mat. Flowers feature 5 triangular sepals, 2 stamens and 5 pointed, oblong, 5mm long petals. Flowering occurs from January to March. Fruit are turbinate shaped, with fruiting occurring from February to March.

== Taxonomy ==
Classification of Donatia novae-zelandiae is somewhat controversial. In 1908, Johannes Mildbraed described Donatiaceae as a subfamily of Stylidiaceae due to uncertainty if the two were significantly different. Due to ecological, habitual and geographic similarities to Stylidiaceae, Donatiaceae was often not recognised as a family in many publications. More recent studies find Donatiaceae to be sufficiently different from Stylidiaceae, based on unique anatomical, morphological, and embryological characteristics. These include an absence of floral column, free stamens and petals, smooth pollen and paracytic stomata. Donatiacae is therefore sister group to Stylidiaceae, with Donatiacae being considered an outgroup, sharing a common ancestor.

Although there is much merit for separate families, many classification systems still class Donatia within the Stylidiaceae family, such as APG III and the Dahlgren system. The earlier APG II system did the same but allowed for optional recognition of Donatiacae.

== Distribution and ecology ==
The species likely originated in Tasmania during the Pliocene and Pleistocene eras, when major Australian and New Zealand mountain ranges formed. This created subsequent glaciation and cooling temperatures, leading to the creation of modern alpine and sub-alpine environments. A long-distance dispersal event, likely aided by Antarctica brought Donatia novae-zelandiae, along with Stylidiaceae species to New Zealand, where they were pre-adapted for alpine and sub-alpine growth.

Donatia novae-zelandiae is most prevalent in cushion moorland, which generally form in areas of high-rainfall with poor drainage, above 800m. The water logging, peat substrate and harsh conditions prevent trees from growing, so these areas become entirely dominated by cushion plants. Donatia novae-zelandiae can be found solitary, or in a mosaic of other cushions and micro shrubbery.

The dense interlocking tufts of cushion plants allow them to survive harsh winds and resist freezing temperatures. In a mosaic, cushion plants are known to facilitate other species through this added protection. When tested on Donatia novae-zelandiae though, a 2012 study by Brittany Cranston found that they were poor facilitators. When added to an open alpine area, species richness of the site was decreased. In contrast, another cushion species, Silene acaulis increased the species richness. It was also found that removing the neighbours of Donatia novae-zelandiae, resulted in notable heat stress. It was therefore concluded that there is great variation in the facilitative effects of cushion plants based on species. Donatia novae-zelandiae is seemingly more adapted to thrive in competition for moorland, gaining more benefit from its neighbours than it provides. It does not play the same role of growing on and stabilising skeletal substrates like other species do.

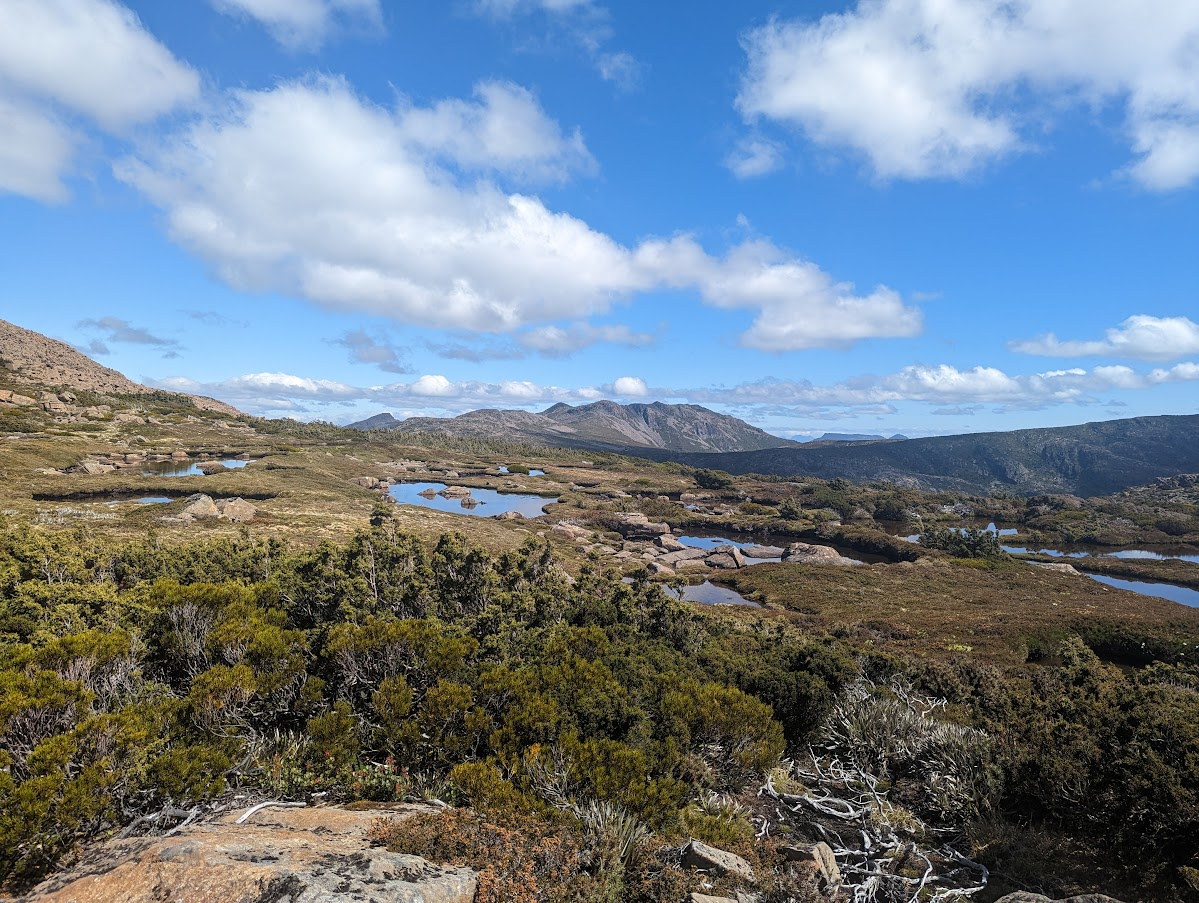
Cushion Plant Dams on the Tarn Shelf, Mt Field.

Ecosystem engineering by cushion plants can also occur along natural waterways of moorland. Here, cushions can grow in height to create dam like walls that prevent water flow. The resulting effect is a series of stepped ponds of water, dammed by cushions such as Donatia novae-zelandiae, promoting further cushion growth in a positive feedback system.

== Threats and conservation ==
Donatia novae-zelandiae is currently classed as "Not Threatened" by the New Zealand Threat Classification System. The narrow niche and clear threats do make them vulnerable in future. As a result of poor nutrient availability and growth focused on density, cushion plants grow slowly, making them vulnerable to disturbance. Trampling by humans has been recorded to cause significantly reduced coverage and lower species diversity than undisturbed areas. Degradation was more severe in water logged areas, creating greater threat to Donatia novae-zelandiae.

Donatia novae-zelandiae is adapted to the cold. A 2015 study showed that artificially warming a site by 1.8 degrees Celsius for two seasons resulted in decreased leaf length, leaf width, seed production and specific leaf area. The most pronounced population decreases in Donatia novae-zelandiae have been a result of fire, of which the alpine species is rarely subjected to. When subject to fires, alpine moorland species take decades to regenerate if they do at all. Climate change is therefore forecast to cause issues in both of these areas.
