= Cushion plant =

Plant life-form

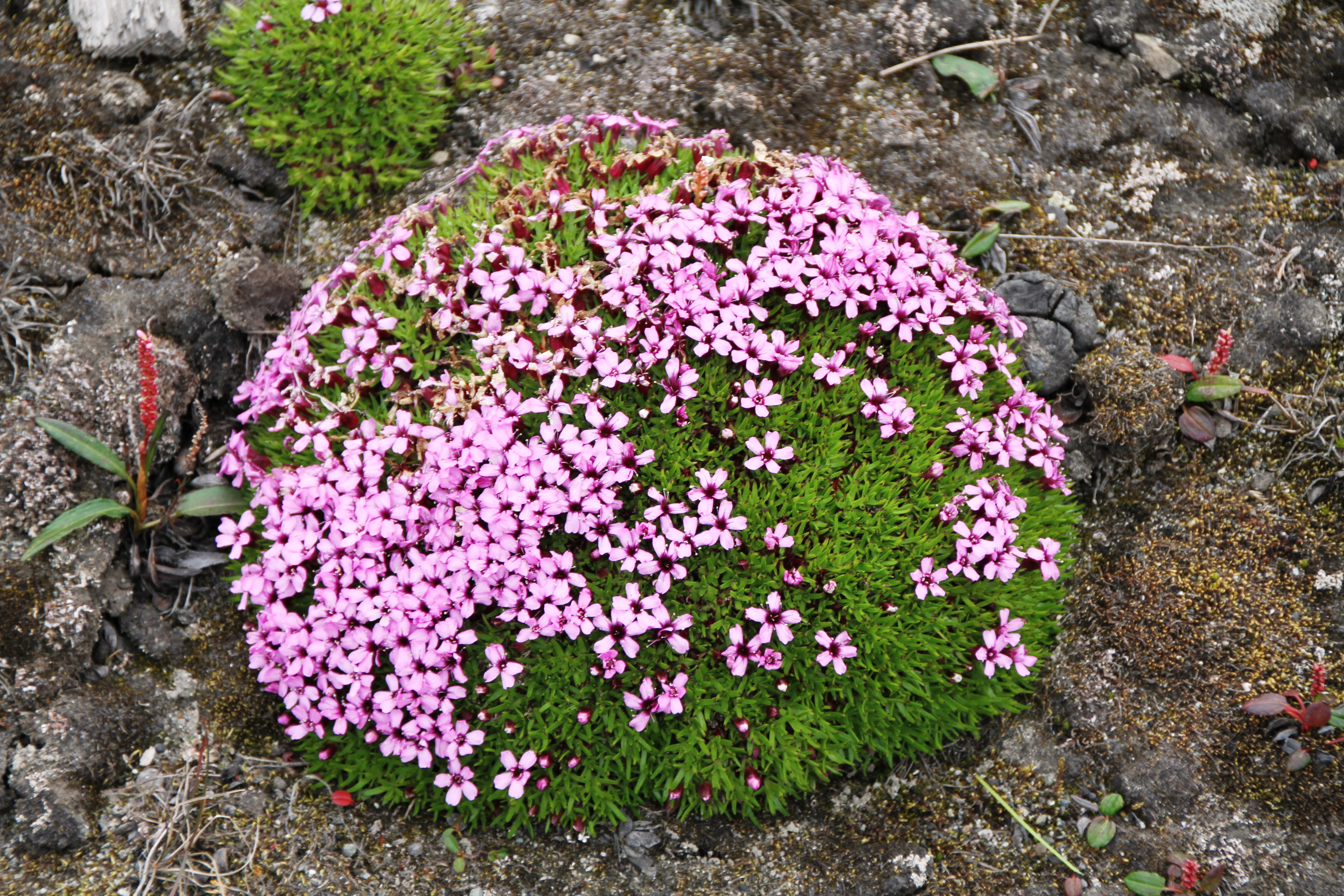
Silene acaulis, moss campion

A cushion plant is a compact, low-growing, mat-forming plant that is found in alpine, subalpine, arctic, or subarctic environments around the world. The term "cushion" is usually applied to woody plants that grow as spreading mats, are limited in height above the ground (a few centimetres at most), have relatively large and deep tap roots, and have life histories adapted to slow growth in a nutrient-poor environment with delayed reproductivity and reproductive cycle adaptations. The plant form is an example of parallel or convergent evolution with species from many different plant families on different continents converging on the same evolutionary adaptations to endure the harsh environmental conditions.

== Description ==
Cushion plants form large, low-growing mats that can grow up to 3 m (10 ft) in diameter. The typical form is a compact mass of closely spaced stems with minimal apical dominance that terminate in individual rosettes. Each stem grows at a consistent rate so that no one rosette is more exposed than the rest of the cushion. Observations on senescence have concluded that cushion plants typically die en masse rather than individual rosettes dying at separate times. Underneath the living rosettes, the plants typically produce nonphotosynthetic material or allow previous leaves to die, creating an insulating effect.

Cushion plants grow very slowly. In the case of Silene acaulis, growth rates have been measured at 0.6 mm (0.02 in) to 18.2 mm (0.72 in) per year. Coinciding with this impeded growth is increased longevity, with the largest cushions of some species attaining ages of up to 350 years. A study on Azorella compacta in southern Peru determined that, based on a growth rate of 1.4 mm per year, individual plants in the study area were upwards of 850 years old with occasional specimens approaching 3,000 years old.

== Ecology ==
Cushion plants commonly grow in rapidly draining rocky or sandy soils in exposed and arid subalpine, alpine, arctic, subarctic or subantarctic feldmark habitats. In certain habitats, such as peaty fens or bogs, cushion plants can also be a keystone species in a climax community. As such, the plants are often colonizers of bare habitat with little or no soil. Due to their role as initiators of primary succession in alpine habitats, the plants have specific adaptations to the desiccation and mechanically harsh environment of windy alpine slopes.

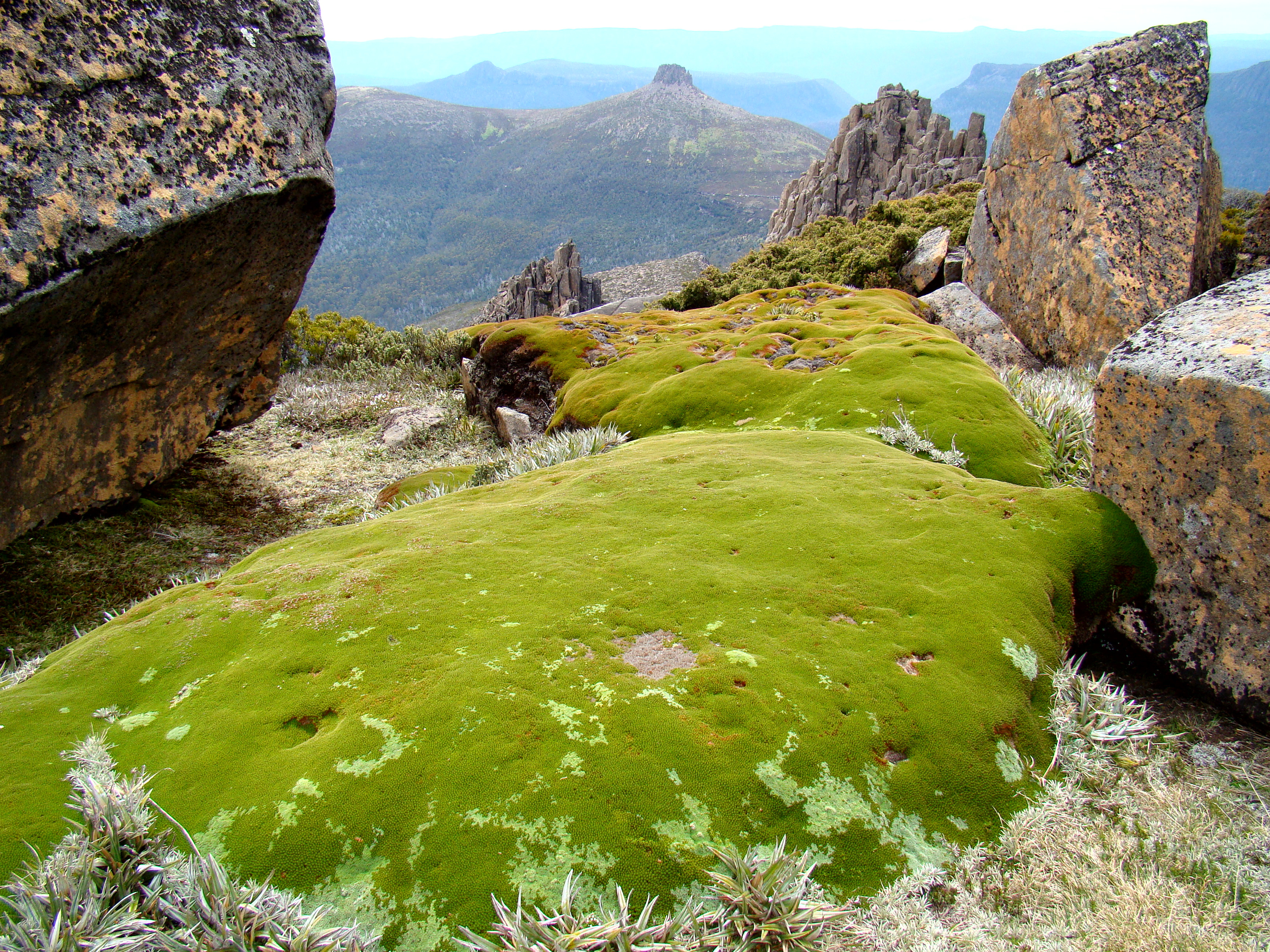
A cushion plant growing on Mount Ossa, Tasmania.

The establishment of a new cushion plant on a windy slope, or freshly exposed Arctic tundra is not a common event. The established plants may be hundreds of years old, although they extend only a few centimetres above the surface. The plants are spreading and are wider than they are tall, but they are not extensive above the ground. The plant will grow for many years before it is ready to begin its first reproductive cycle. The plant actively grows only during the limited period when enough warmth and sunlight are available for photosynthesis, but may begin this cycle prior to the snow melting. The plant's form is well adapted to trapping warm summer air within its body to extend the time during which it can photosynthesize. Cushions at higher elevation are typically smaller and denser.

Plants growing in the alpine or subalpine regions face the challenge of obtaining and retaining water. One solution for obtaining water is the growth of an extensive root system. A small alpine forget-me-not may stand only centimetres above the ground, but its taproot can extend for 60 centimetres below the soil surface. The long taproot is necessary because of both the limited precipitation in many alpine and arctic environments, mostly as snowfall, and because of the rapid drainage of a newly formed and shallow soil. Besides obtaining water, the plant must also retain moisture to survive in a dry and desiccating environment. The compact growth form of cushion plants reduces air flow over the surface of the epidermis, reducing the rate of water loss. Additionally, many cushion plants have small and fleshy leaves which reduce the surface area of the plant, which reduces transpiration and conserves water. In alpine environments well above the tree line, cold is a limiting factor for growth. So, by having tightly packed stems and foliage, cushion plants are able to convert and trap heat from sunlight, causing them to warm several degrees above the ambient air temperature and extend their short growing season. Many alpine cushion plants also have thick matted hairs that warm up and heat the air trapped in between the hairs when the sun shines. These hairs also act as a greenhouse by preventing the warmer air from rising away from the plant, and they also act as wind breaks, preventing the wind from blowing away the trapped heat.

The cushion plant may have flowers that are large and showy for such a small perennial, or sometimes hundreds of small flowers. This is necessary to attract pollinators over long distances, and in the short season of growth.

Cushion plants have been described as ecosystem engineers because of their ability to locally maintain increased moisture and soil temperatures below the cushion ±15 °C (±27 °F) relative to adjacent soil temperatures. Some, specifically Mulinum leptacanthum and Oreopolus glacialis, have been positively identified as species that alter the macronutrient concentrations in the soil. These attributes allow other species to more easily colonize the harsh environments that cushion plants inhabit. Species richness is therefore demonstrably increased where cushion plants have colonized.

== Diversity ==
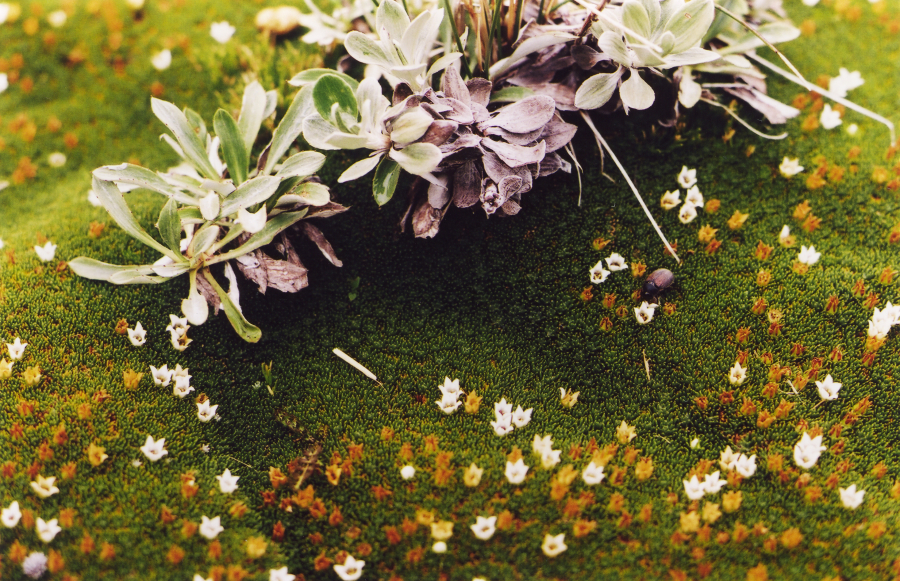
Donatia novae-zelandiae

The cushion plant form is not endemic to any single area or plant family. About 338 species worldwide in 78 genera in areas ranging from Tasmania, New Zealand, and Tierra del Fuego to the arctic tundra of Svalbard have convergently evolved the same plant form in response to similar environmental conditions. Thirty-four diverse plant families, such as Apiaceae, Asteraceae, Caryophyllaceae, Donatiaceae, and the Stylidiaceae, include cushion plant species.
