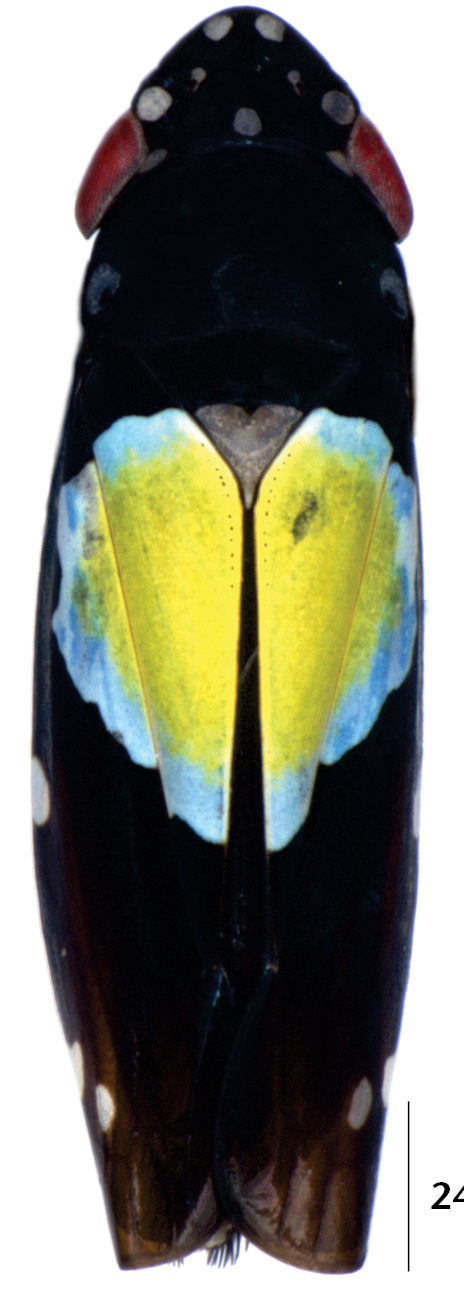

Scientific classification
- Kingdom: Animalia
- Phylum: Arthropoda
- Class: Insecta
- Order: Hemiptera
- Suborder: Auchenorrhyncha
- Family: Cicadellidae
- Genus: Cavichiana
- Species: C. bromelicola

Binomial name
- Cavichiana bromelicola Mejdalani et al., 2014

= Cavichiana bromelicola =

Species of insect

Cavichiana bromelicola is a species of sharpshooter within the family Cicadellidae.

== Description ==
Cavichiana bromelicola reach lengths of around 6 mm and a width of 2 mm. The body of the insect is dark brown to black in colour. It has single large yellow spot that spans across the forewings, which exhibits a light blue border around it. The insect also has light blue to white spots on its head and wings. It also possesses red eyes.

== Distribution and habitat ==
Cavichiana bromelicola is native to the east coast of Brazil, where it can be found inhabiting restinga habitat, which is a type of broadleaf forest that grows coastally on acidic nutrient poor soils. C. bromelicola feeds exclusively on bromeliads such as Neoregelia cruenta and N. johannis. Despite the species having a very limited natural dispersal capacity it has been introduced into urban environments such as gardens where humans cultivate bromeliads for ornamental purposes.
