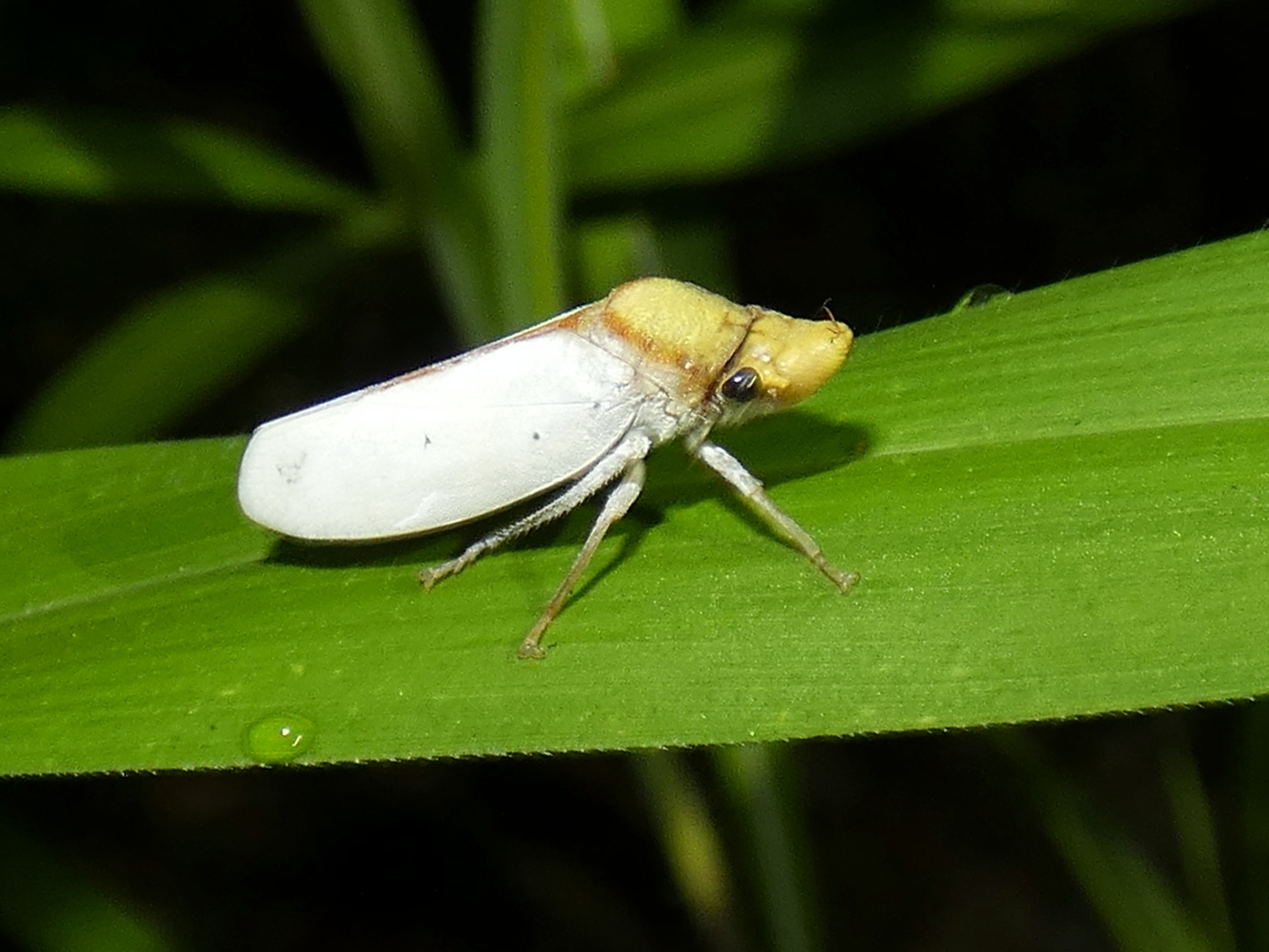

Scientific classification
- Domain: Eukaryota
- Kingdom: Animalia
- Phylum: Arthropoda
- Class: Insecta
- Order: Hemiptera
- Suborder: Auchenorrhyncha
- Family: Cicadellidae
- Genus: Diestostemma
- Species: D. chinai

Binomial name
- Diestostemma chinai Young, 1968

= Diestostemma chinai =

Species of leafhopper

Diestostemma chinai is a species of sharpshooter in the genus Diestostemma.
