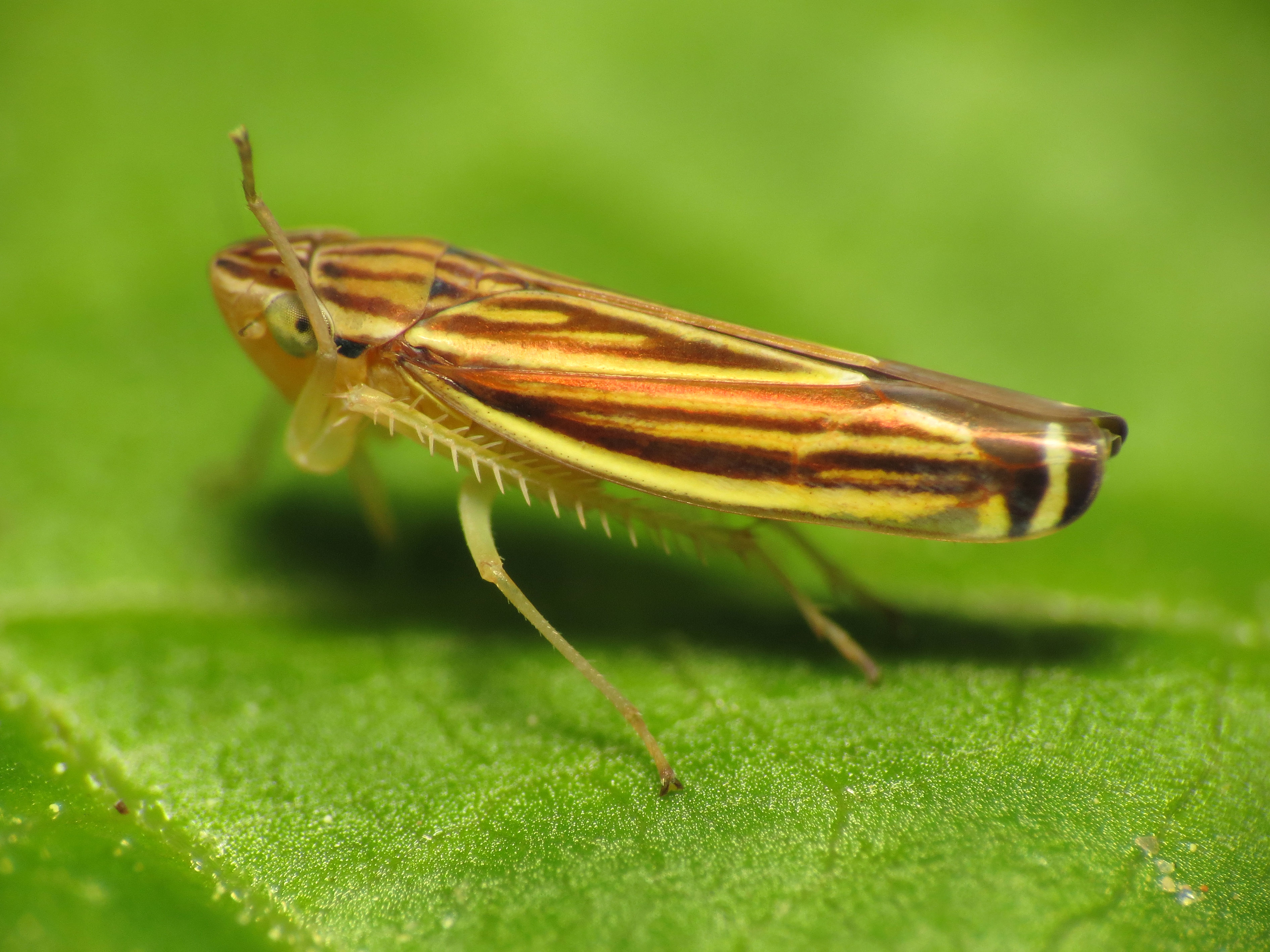

Scientific classification
- Domain: Eukaryota
- Kingdom: Animalia
- Phylum: Arthropoda
- Class: Insecta
- Order: Hemiptera
- Suborder: Auchenorrhyncha
- Family: Cicadellidae
- Genus: Sibovia
- Species: S. occatoria

Binomial name
- Sibovia occatoria Say, 1830

= Sibovia occatoria =

Species of true bug

Sibovia occatoria, commonly known as the yellow-striped leafhopper, is a species of sharpshooter in the family Cicadellidae. It is native to North and Central America, from the United States to El Salvador.
