= O. nigricans =

O. nigricans may refer to:

- Onchidella nigricans, a small air-breathing sea slug species
- Oncometopia nigricans, a sharpshooter species in the genus Oncometopia found in North and South America

== See also ==
- Nigricans (disambiguation)
