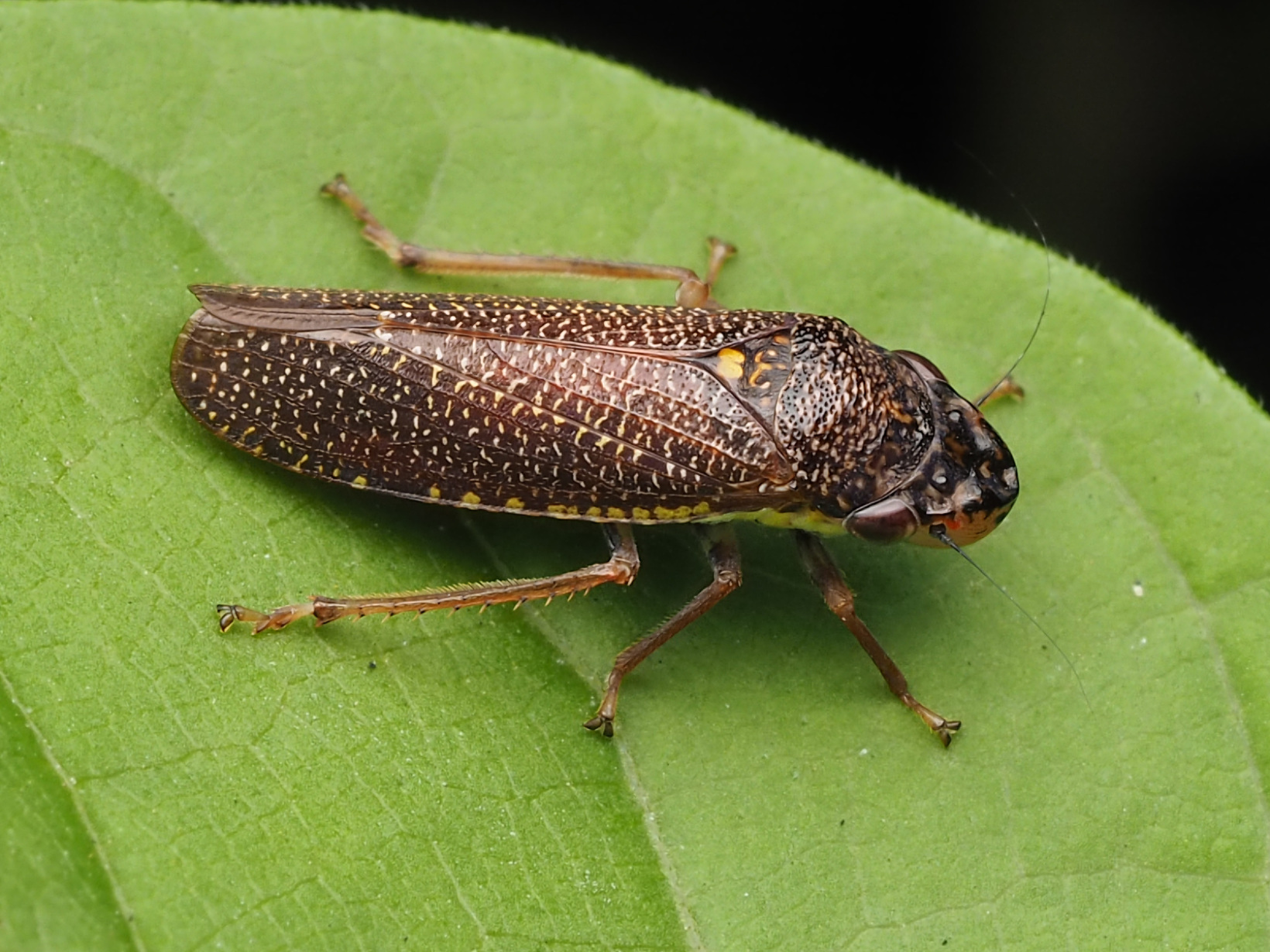

Scientific classification
- Domain: Eukaryota
- Kingdom: Animalia
- Phylum: Arthropoda
- Class: Insecta
- Order: Hemiptera
- Suborder: Auchenorrhyncha
- Family: Cicadellidae
- Genus: Paraulacizes
- Species: P. irrorata

Binomial name
- Paraulacizes irrorata (Fabricius, 1794)

= Paraulacizes irrorata =

Species of leafhopper

Paraulacizes irrorata, the speckled sharpshooter, is a species of sharpshooter in the family Cicadellidae.

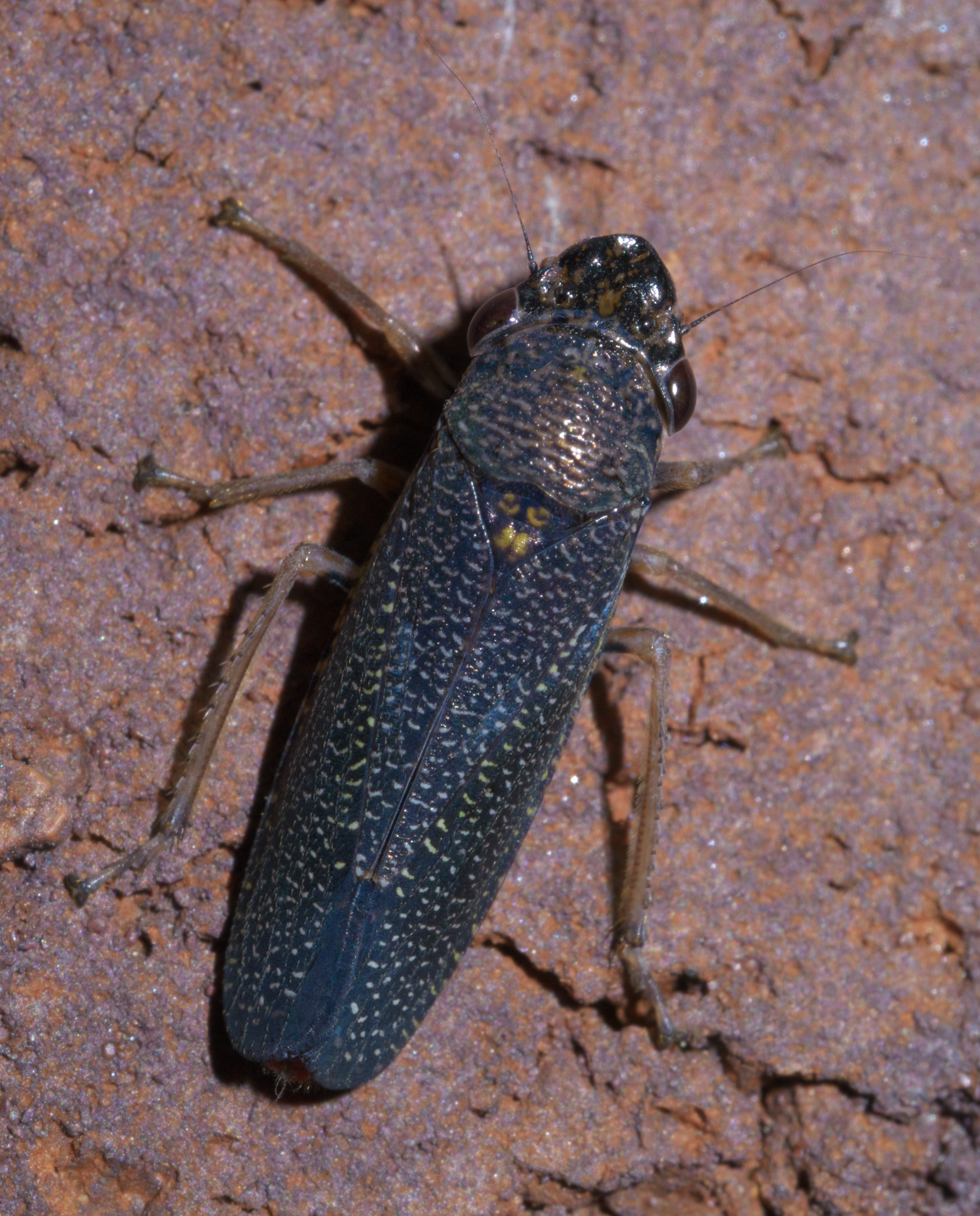
Speckled sharpshooter, Paraulacizes irrorata

They lay eggs in woody twigs, stems, or petioles, and their eggs can become infected by Gonatocerus fasciatus, which acts as a parasitoid.
