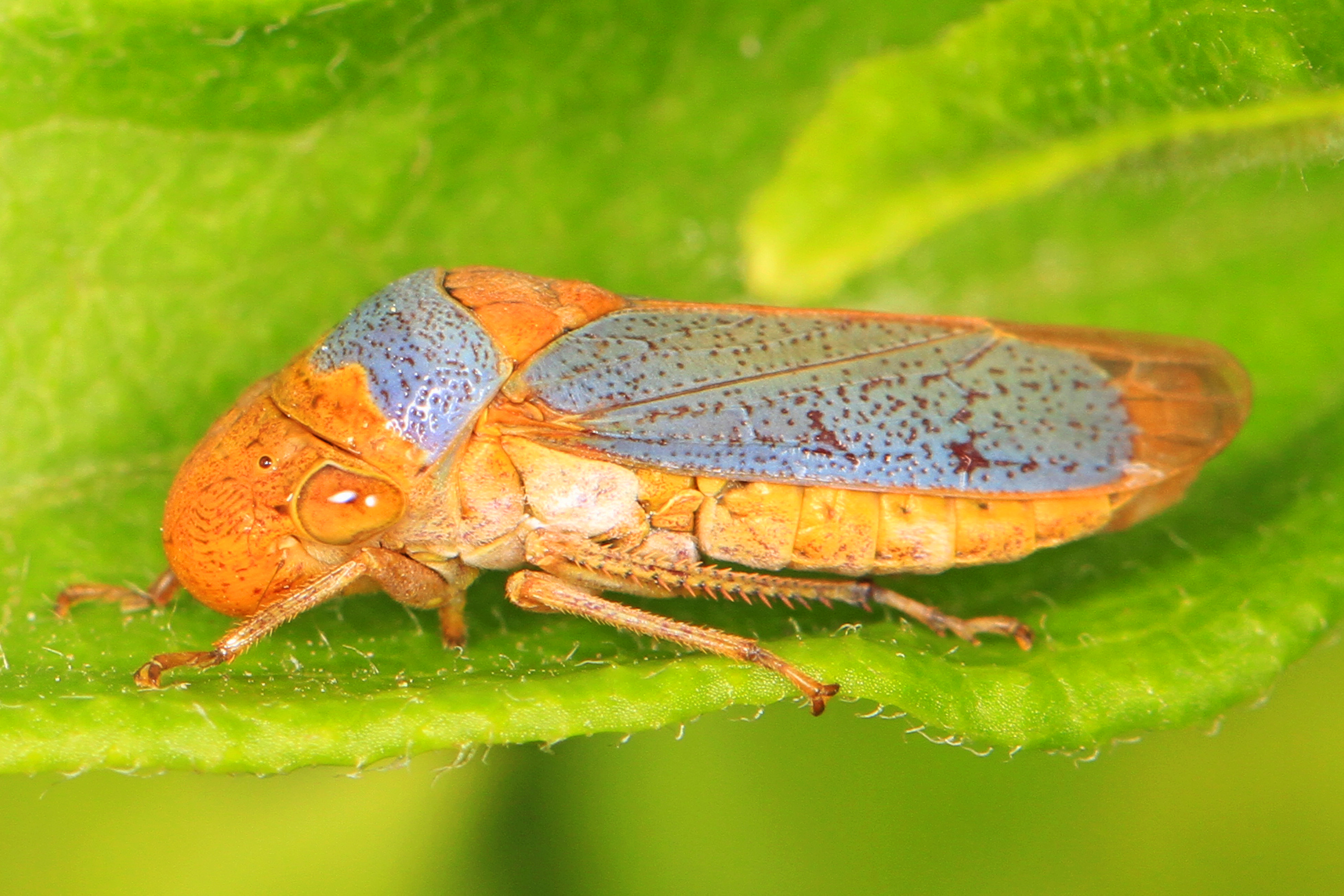

Scientific classification
- Domain: Eukaryota
- Kingdom: Animalia
- Phylum: Arthropoda
- Class: Insecta
- Order: Hemiptera
- Suborder: Auchenorrhyncha
- Family: Cicadellidae
- Genus: Oncometopia
- Species: O. clarior

Binomial name
- Oncometopia clarior (Walker, 1851)

= Oncometopia clarior =

Species of leafhopper

Oncometopia clarior is a species of sharpshooter in the family Cicadellidae.
