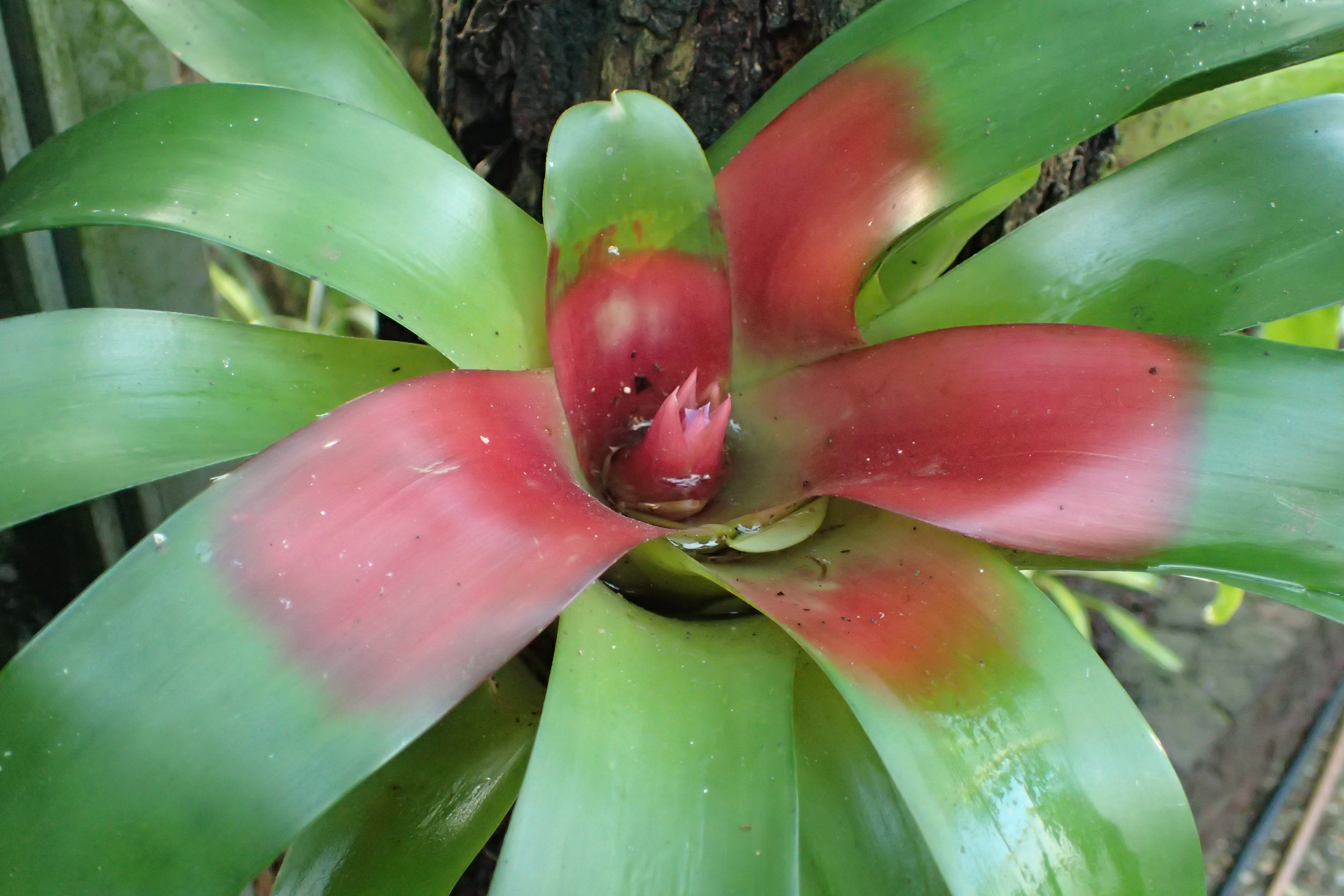

Scientific classification
- Kingdom: Plantae
- Clade: Embryophytes
- Clade: Tracheophytes
- Clade: Spermatophytes
- Clade: Angiosperms
- Clade: Monocots
- Clade: Commelinids
- Order: Poales
- Family: Bromeliaceae
- Genus: Neoregelia
- Subgenus: Neoregelia subg. Neoregelia
- Species: N. schubertii

Binomial name
- Neoregelia schubertii Roeth

= Neoregelia schubertii =

Species of flowering plant

Neoregelia schubertii is a flowering plant in the genus Neoregelia. It is native to Brazil. As of November 2022, the Encyclopaedia of Bromeliads regarded it as a synonym of Neoregelia compacta.
