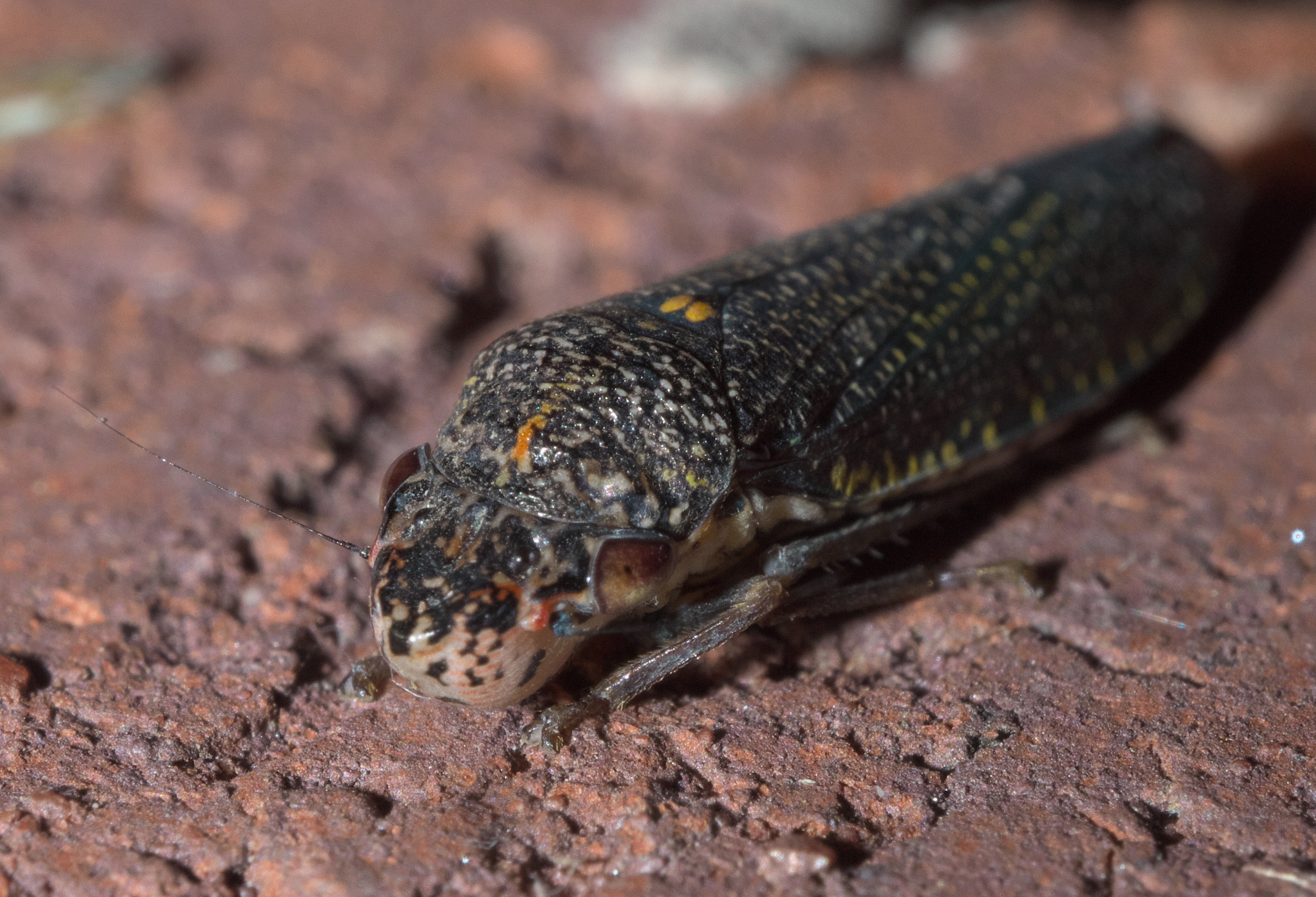
- Paraulacizes irrorata

Scientific classification
- Kingdom: Animalia
- Phylum: Arthropoda
- Clade: Pancrustacea
- Class: Insecta
- Order: Hemiptera
- Suborder: Auchenorrhyncha
- Family: Cicadellidae
- Tribe: Proconiini
- Genus: Paraulacizes; Young, 1968

= Paraulacizes =

Genus of leafhoppers

Paraulacizes is a genus of sharpshooters in the family Cicadellidae. There are about 11 described species in Paraulacizes.

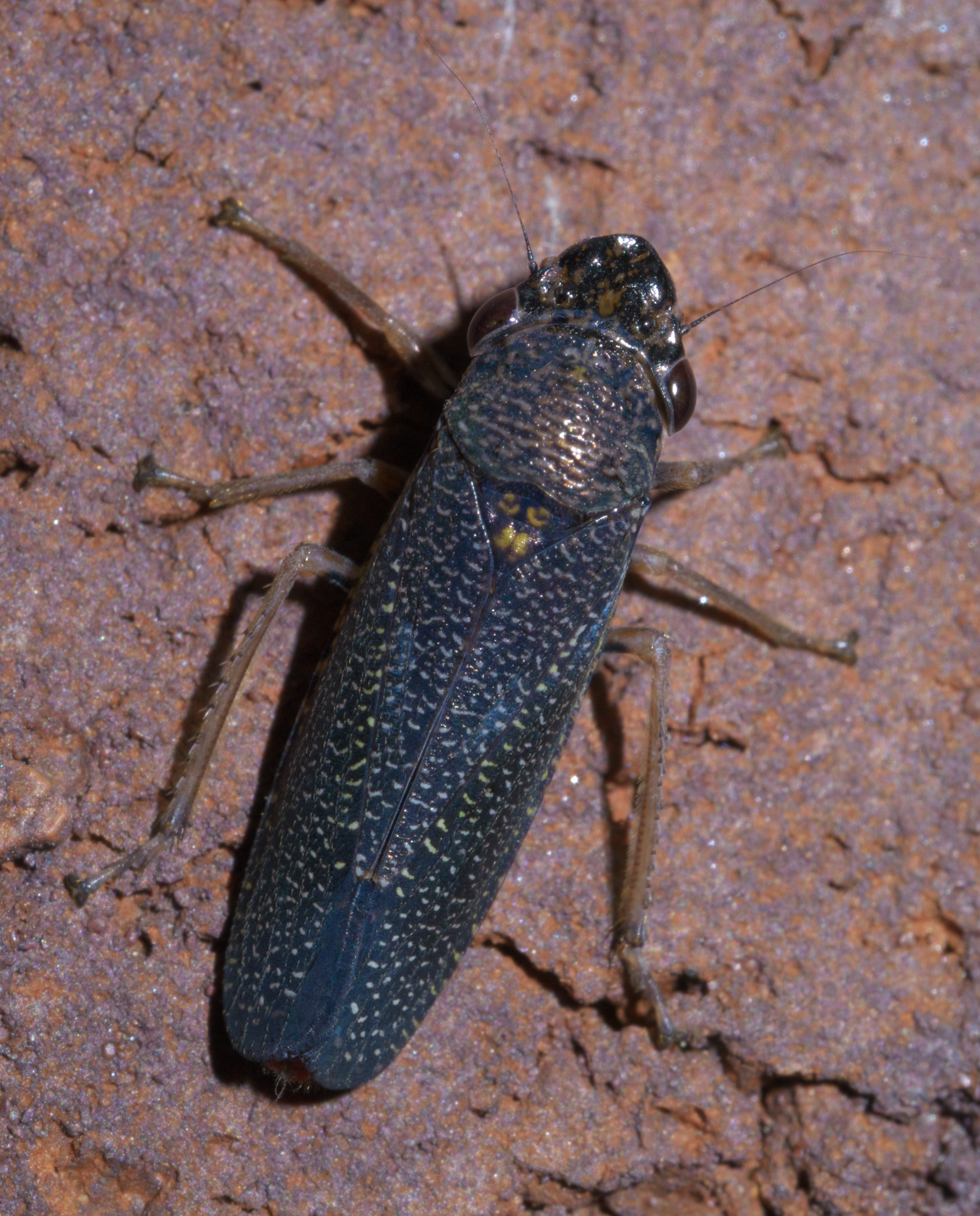
Paraulacizes irrorata

== Species ==
- Paraulacizes aurantiaca (Signoret, 1855)^{c}
- Paraulacizes confusa (Signoret, 1855)^{c g}
- Paraulacizes figurata (Fowler, 1898)^{c g}
- Paraulacizes irrorata (Fabricius, 1794)^{c g b} (speckled sharpshooter)
- Paraulacizes lugubris (Fowler, 1898)^{c g}
- Paraulacizes mutans (Signoret, 1855)^{c g}
- Paraulacizes panamensis (Fowler, 1899)^{c g}
- Paraulacizes piperata (Fowler, 1898)^{c g}
- Paraulacizes pollinosa (Fowler, 1899)^{c g}
- Paraulacizes sparsa (Fowler, 1899)^{c g b}
- Paraulacizes thunbergii (Stal, 1864)^{c g}

Data sources: i = ITIS, c = Catalogue of Life, g = GBIF, b = Bugguide.net
