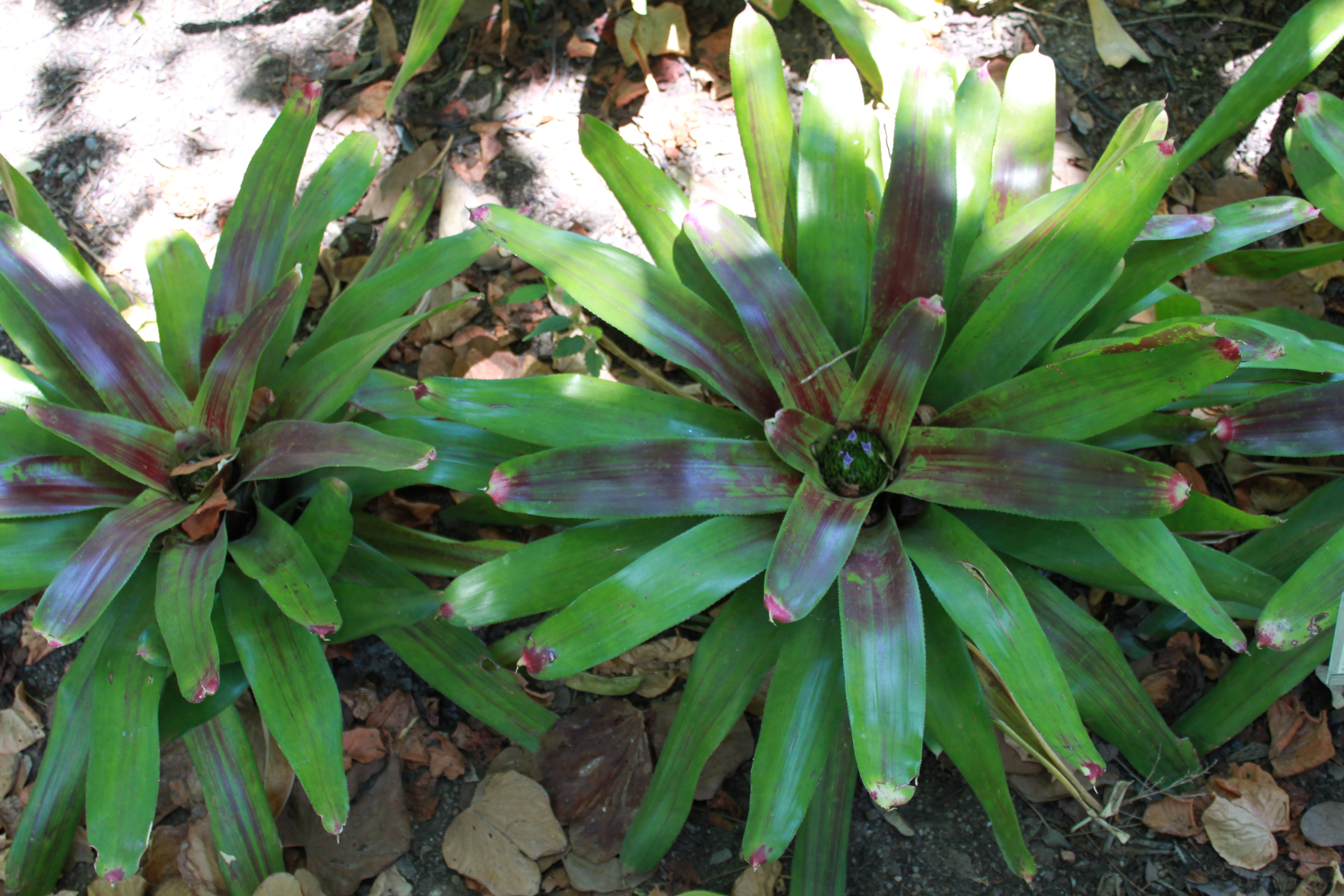

Scientific classification
- Kingdom: Plantae
- Clade: Embryophytes
- Clade: Tracheophytes
- Clade: Spermatophytes
- Clade: Angiosperms
- Clade: Monocots
- Clade: Commelinids
- Order: Poales
- Family: Bromeliaceae
- Genus: Neoregelia
- Subgenus: Neoregelia subg. Neoregelia
- Species: N. farinosa

Binomial name
- Neoregelia farinosa (Ule) L.B.Sm.

= Neoregelia farinosa =

Species of flowering plant

Neoregelia farinosa is a species of flowering plant in the genus Neoregelia. It is endemic to Brazil.

== Cultivars ==
- Neoregelia 'Angela Espinosa'
- Neoregelia 'Electric Red'
- Neoregelia 'ExEx Three'
- Neoregelia 'Far Superior'
- Neoregelia 'Far-Fost'
- Neoregelia 'Fire Bird'
- Neoregelia 'Fost-Far'
- Neoregelia 'George'
- Neoregelia 'Green Rosette'
- Neoregelia 'Lavender Mist'
- Neoregelia 'Lemon Blush'
- Neoregelia 'Lolita'
- Neoregelia 'Margaret'
- Neoregelia 'Morrisoniana'
- Neoregelia 'Painted Lady'
- Neoregelia 'Red Devil'
- Neoregelia 'Rojizo'
- Neoregelia 'Rose Apple'
- Neoregelia 'Rosea Striata'
- Neoregelia 'Russell Lively'
- Neoregelia 'Sharon's Delight'
- Neoregelia 'Spotted Fire Bird'
- Neoregelia 'Ti Di'
- × Neomea 'Flame'
