= Neoregelia chlorosticta =

Scientific classification
- Kingdom: Plantae
- Clade: Tracheophytes
- Clade: Angiosperms
- Clade: Monocots
- Clade: Commelinids
- Order: Poales
- Family: Bromeliaceae
- Genus: Neoregelia
- Subgenus: Neoregelia subg. Neoregelia
- Species: N. chlorosticta

Binomial name
- Neoregelia chlorosticta (Baker) L.B.Sm.

Species of flowering plant

Neoregelia chlorosticta is a species of flowering plant in the genus Neoregelia. This species is endemic to Brazil.

== Cultivars ==
- Neoregelia 'Accord'
- Neoregelia 'Amethyst'
- Neoregelia 'Amity'
- Neoregelia 'Anemone'
- Neoregelia 'Antonio'
- Neoregelia 'Awareness'
- Neoregelia 'Bambi'
- Neoregelia 'Beau'
- Neoregelia 'Beelzebub'
- Neoregelia 'Best Bet'
- Neoregelia 'Black Jack'
- Neoregelia 'Bliss'
- Neoregelia 'Born of Fire'
- Neoregelia 'Bright Spot'
- Neoregelia 'Bronze Beauty'
- Neoregelia 'Burnished Copper'
- Neoregelia 'Charm'
- Neoregelia 'Charmian'
- Neoregelia 'Chloromarcon'
- Neoregelia 'Cockatoo'
- Neoregelia 'Cuddle'
- Neoregelia 'Dainty Doll'
- Neoregelia 'Dark Delight'
- Neoregelia 'Dark Glory'
- Neoregelia 'Dazzle'
- Neoregelia 'Dexter'
- Neoregelia 'Dimboola'
- Neoregelia 'Divine'
- Neoregelia 'Dobell'
- Neoregelia 'Domino'
- Neoregelia 'Down and Out'
- Neoregelia 'Dr. Oeser (Dr. O)'
- Neoregelia 'Duffer'
- Neoregelia 'Dusky'
- Neoregelia 'Dynamo'
- Neoregelia 'Envy'
- Neoregelia 'Etching'
- Neoregelia 'Ethereal'
- Neoregelia 'Fabulous'
- Neoregelia 'Fair Maid'
- Neoregelia 'Fame and Fortune'
- Neoregelia 'Fashionable'
- Neoregelia 'Feuerland'
- Neoregelia 'Fiddlesticks'
- Neoregelia 'Fidget'
- Neoregelia 'Filigree'
- Neoregelia 'Finery'
- Neoregelia 'Fire Bird'
- Neoregelia 'Flaming Copper'
- Neoregelia 'For Olwen'
- Neoregelia 'Frazzle'
- Neoregelia 'Freckle Face'
- Neoregelia 'Frolic'
- Neoregelia 'Fuddle'
- Neoregelia 'Galactic'
- Neoregelia 'Gay Quilting'
- Neoregelia 'Gay Rebel'
- Neoregelia 'Gingerbread'
- Neoregelia 'Gipsy Moth'
- Neoregelia 'Good Faith'
- Neoregelia 'Grace Goode'
- Neoregelia 'Grace Goode Girl'
- Neoregelia 'Gwenavalia'
- Neoregelia 'Heart of Gold'
- Neoregelia 'Hosanna'
- Neoregelia 'Hotpants'
- Neoregelia 'Innocence'
- Neoregelia 'Jackpot'
- Neoregelia 'Jamboree'
- Neoregelia 'Jazzer'
- Neoregelia 'Jodie'
- Neoregelia 'Jubilant'
- Neoregelia 'Just Perky'
- Neoregelia 'Kasper'
- Neoregelia 'Kathryn'
- Neoregelia 'Ketchup'
- Neoregelia 'Kindly Light'
- Neoregelia 'Kiwi Magic'
- Neoregelia 'Krasny'
- Neoregelia 'Kybosh'
- Neoregelia 'Lasting Memories'
- Neoregelia 'Laudable'
- Neoregelia 'Lemon Drop'
- Neoregelia 'Lena Regina'
- Neoregelia 'Little Beauty'
- Neoregelia 'Little Dotty'
- Neoregelia 'Little Red Hen'
- Neoregelia 'Little Rose'
- Neoregelia 'Lorelle'
- Neoregelia 'Lost Weekend'
- Neoregelia 'Lovable'
- Neoregelia 'Love Me Tender'
- Neoregelia 'Lovers Leap'
- Neoregelia 'Magic Light'
- Neoregelia 'Make Believe'
- Neoregelia 'Marble Throat'
- Neoregelia 'Merv's Rubella'
- Neoregelia 'Meteor Shower'
- Neoregelia 'Morning Star'
- Neoregelia 'Much Ado'
- Neoregelia 'Muggins'
- Neoregelia 'Mystic'
- Neoregelia 'Negligee'
- Neoregelia 'Night Sky'
- Neoregelia 'Old Smoothie'
- Neoregelia 'Orange Beauty'
- Neoregelia 'Pageant'
- Neoregelia 'Panama Queen'
- Neoregelia 'Pappilon'
- Neoregelia 'Paradise Point'
- Neoregelia 'Polkadot'
- Neoregelia 'Ravishing'
- Neoregelia 'Reckless'
- Neoregelia 'Red Appeal'
- Neoregelia 'Red Beauty'
- Neoregelia 'Red Face'
- Neoregelia 'Red Marble'
- Neoregelia 'Red Ribbons'
- Neoregelia 'Reddy Set Go'
- Neoregelia 'Reward'
- Neoregelia 'Robust'
- Neoregelia 'Rojoverde'
- Neoregelia 'Rot Chianti'
- Neoregelia 'Rubeo'
- Neoregelia 'Ruby Jean'
- Neoregelia 'Russet Beauty'
- Neoregelia 'Scandalous'
- Neoregelia 'Scarlet Red'
- Neoregelia 'Scarlet Star'
- Neoregelia 'Sitting Pretty'
- Neoregelia 'Slow Joe'
- Neoregelia 'Small Wager'
- Neoregelia 'Smart Image'
- Neoregelia 'Solar Eclipse'
- Neoregelia 'Spotted Fire Bird'
- Neoregelia 'Star Of Bethlehem'
- Neoregelia 'Sugar and Spice'
- Neoregelia 'Sweetheart'
- Neoregelia 'Sweetie Pie'
- Neoregelia 'Tan Beauty'
- Neoregelia 'Tascha'
- Neoregelia 'Tickle Your Fancy'
- Neoregelia 'Top Brass'
- Neoregelia 'Turbulent'
- Neoregelia 'Valley'
- Neoregelia 'Verna'
- Neoregelia 'Veyron'
- Neoregelia 'Wally'
- Neoregelia 'Willy Wagtail'
- Neoregelia 'Wine Charm'
- Neoregelia 'Wine Gay'
- Neoregelia 'Wine Glow'
- Neoregelia 'Winner'
