= Neoregelia smithii =

Scientific classification
- Kingdom: Plantae
- Clade: Embryophytes
- Clade: Tracheophytes
- Clade: Spermatophytes
- Clade: Angiosperms
- Clade: Monocots
- Clade: Commelinids
- Order: Poales
- Family: Bromeliaceae
- Genus: Neoregelia
- Subgenus: Neoregelia subg. Neoregelia
- Species: N. smithii

Binomial name
- Neoregelia smithii W.Weber

Species of flowering plant

Neoregelia smithii is a species of flowering plant in the genus Neoregelia. It is native to Brazil.

== Cultivars ==
- Neoregelia 'Aussie Opal'
- Neoregelia 'Blueberry Muffin'
- Neoregelia 'Caviar'
- Neoregelia 'Damask Rose'
- Neoregelia 'Garden King'
- Neoregelia 'Ink Spots'
- Neoregelia 'Java Plum'
- Neoregelia 'Oppenheimer'
- Neoregelia 'Purple Gem'
- Neoregelia 'Wine and Gold'
