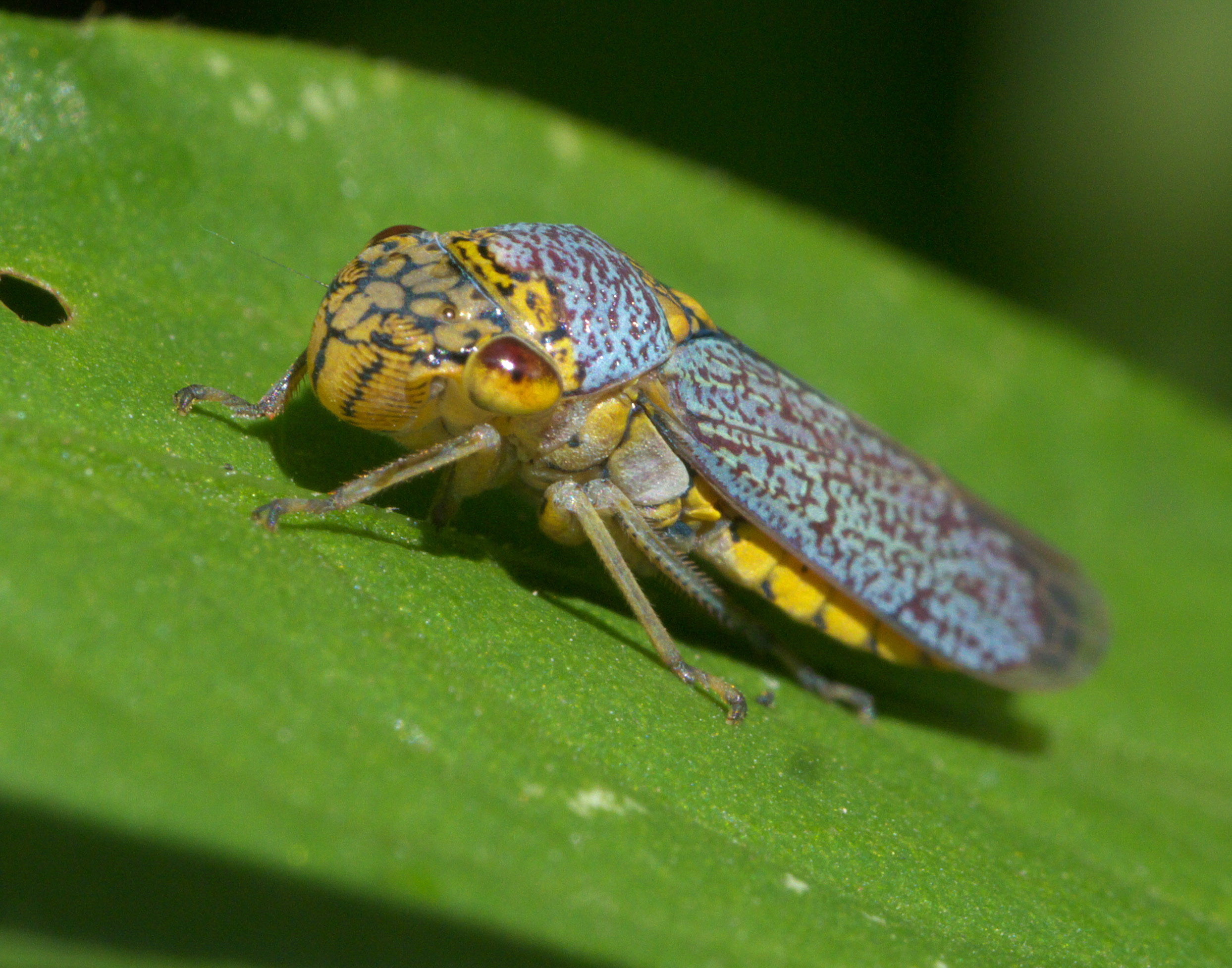

Scientific classification
- Domain: Eukaryota
- Kingdom: Animalia
- Phylum: Arthropoda
- Class: Insecta
- Order: Hemiptera
- Suborder: Auchenorrhyncha
- Family: Cicadellidae
- Genus: Oncometopia
- Species: O. orbona

Binomial name
- Oncometopia orbona (Fabricius, 1798)

= Oncometopia orbona =

Species of leafhopper

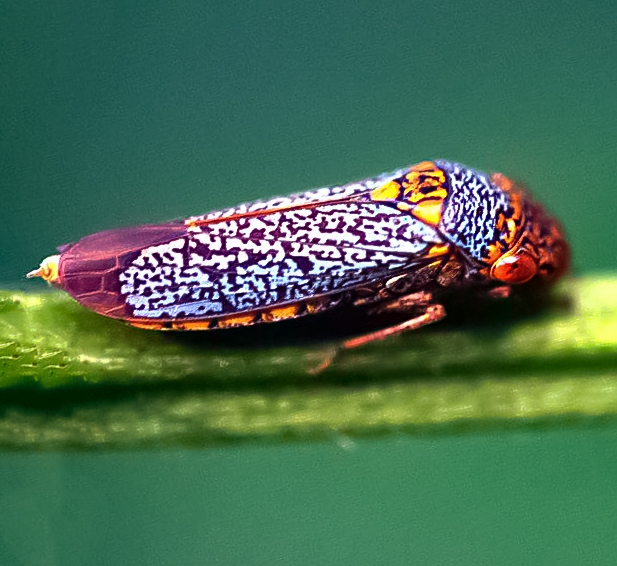
Broad-headed Sharpshooter (Oncometopia orbona)

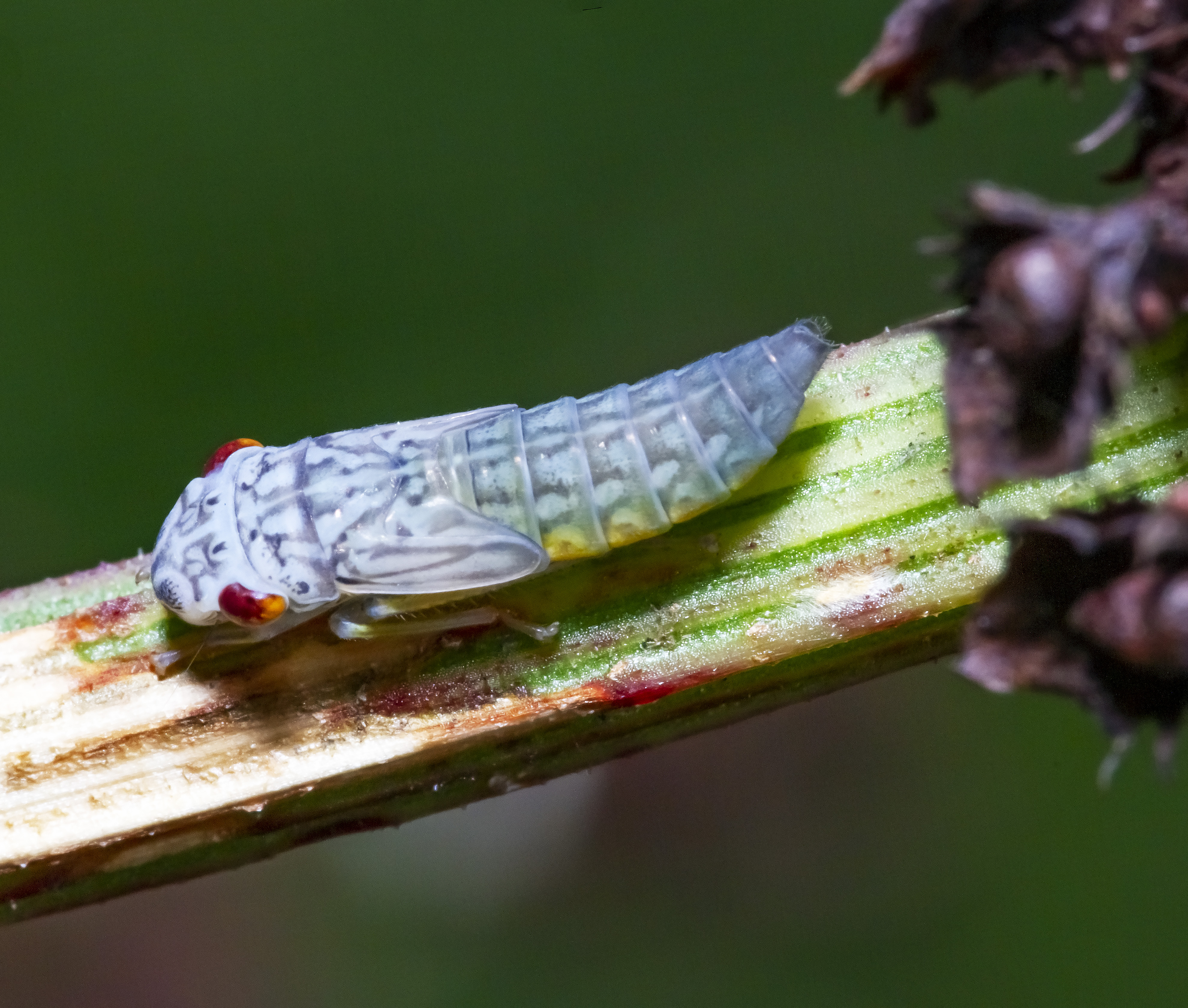
Oncometopia orbona Nymph

Oncometopia orbona, the broad-headed sharpshooter, is a species of sharpshooter in the family Cicadellidae.

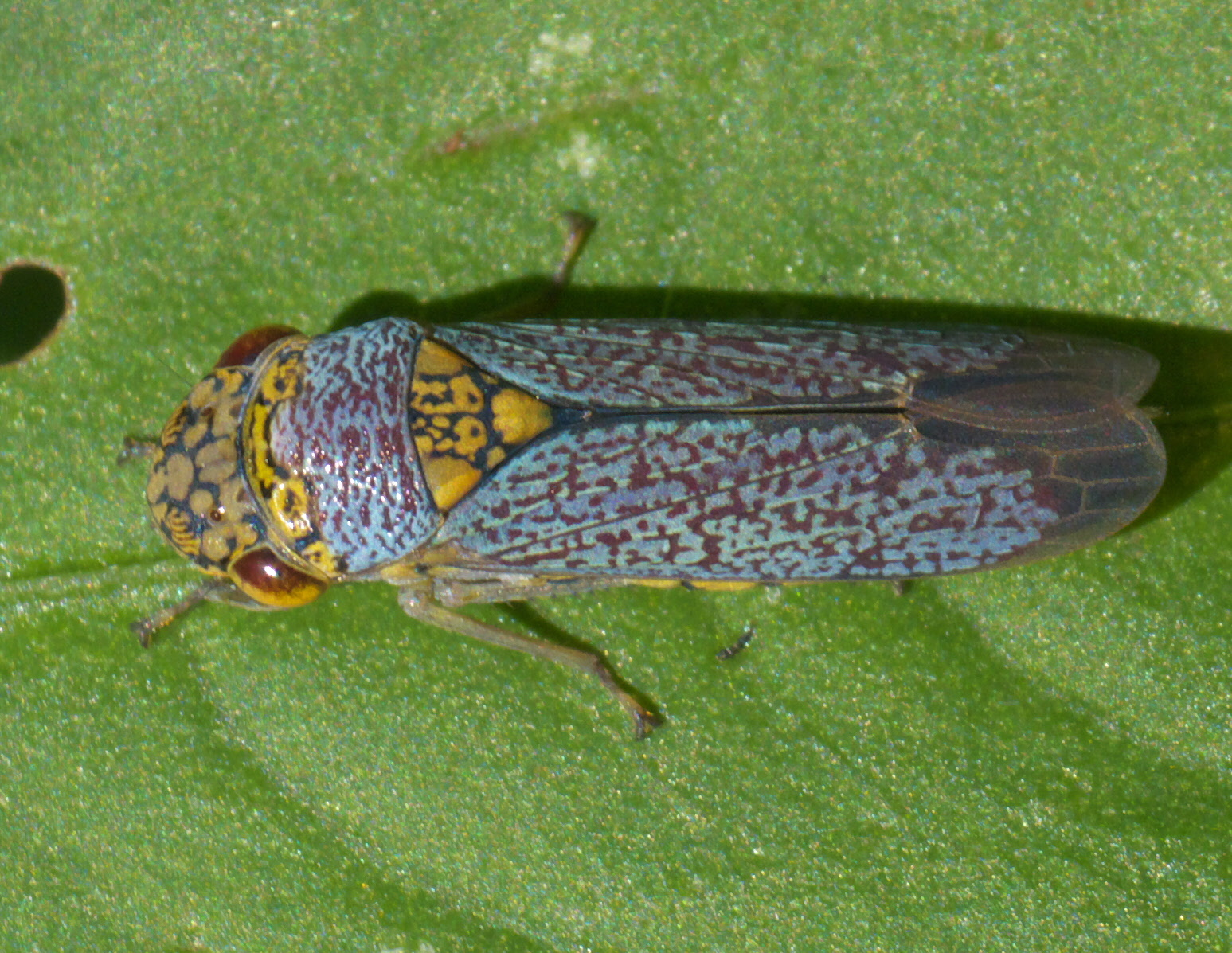
Broad-headed sharpshooter, Oncometopia orbona
