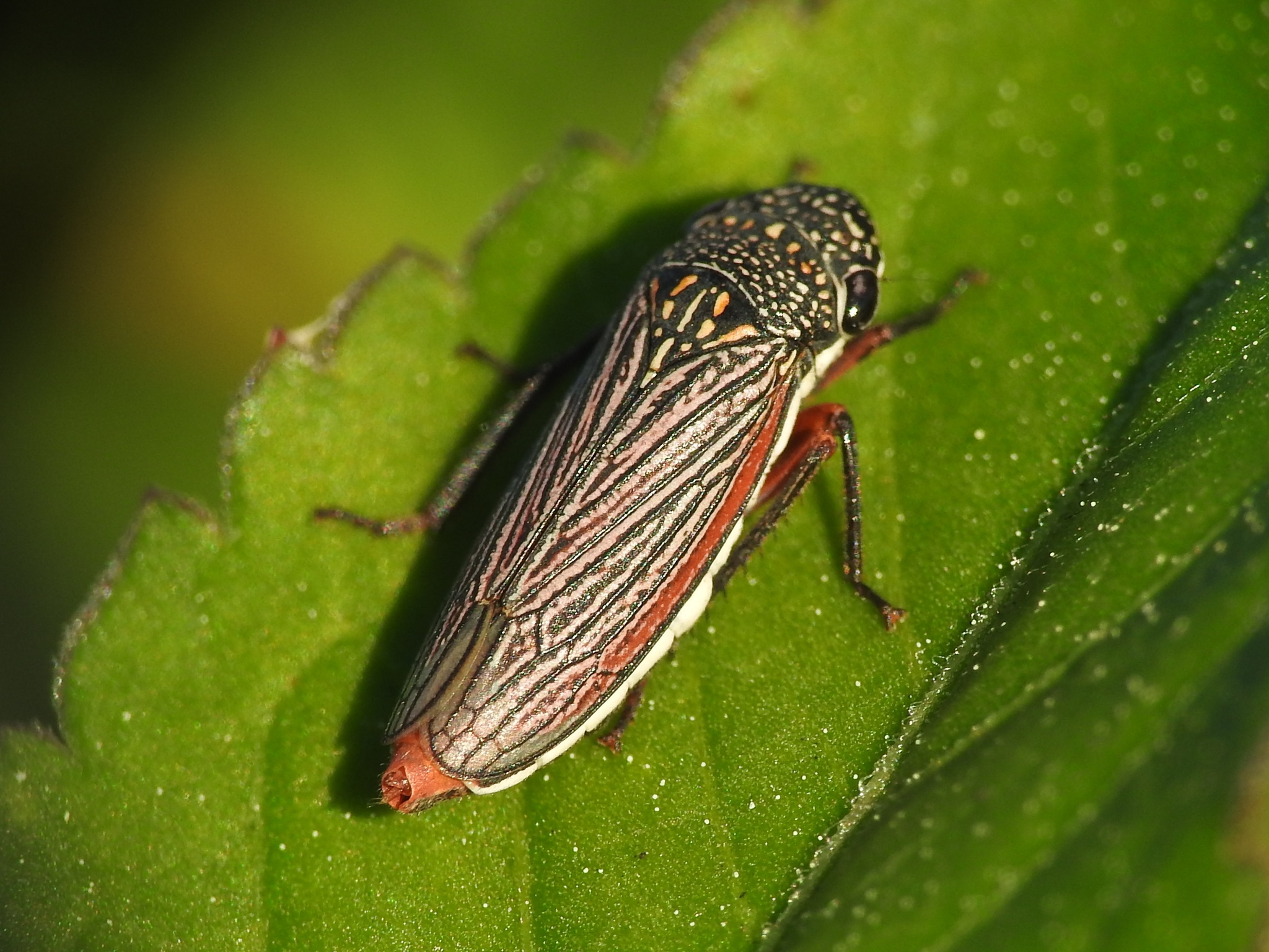
- Adult in Florida, United States

Scientific classification
- Domain: Eukaryota
- Kingdom: Animalia
- Phylum: Arthropoda
- Class: Insecta
- Order: Hemiptera
- Suborder: Auchenorrhyncha
- Family: Cicadellidae
- Genus: Cuerna
- Species: C. costalis

Binomial name
- Cuerna costalis (Fabricius, 1803)

= Cuerna costalis =

Species of leafhopper

Cuerna costalis, also known as the lateral-lined sharpshooter, is a species of insect in the leafhopper family, Cicadellidae. It is native to the Eastern half of the United States.

== Identification ==
This species is black and red with longitudinal stripes on forewing. It has a conspicuous white stripe that runs from the eye along the side of the abdomen. The tip of the abdomen has a red spot. It is the only species in the genus with red on its legs.
