= Neoregelia wilsoniana =

Scientific classification
- Kingdom: Plantae
- Clade: Tracheophytes
- Clade: Angiosperms
- Clade: Monocots
- Clade: Commelinids
- Order: Poales
- Family: Bromeliaceae
- Genus: Neoregelia
- Subgenus: Neoregelia subg. Neoregelia
- Species: N. wilsoniana

Binomial name
- Neoregelia wilsoniana M.B.Foster

Species of flowering plant

Neoregelia wilsoniana is a species of flowering plant in the genus Neoregelia.

== Cultivars ==
- Neoregelia 'B.J. Hall'
- Neoregelia 'Black Bandit'
- Neoregelia 'Butternut'
- Neoregelia 'Doofus'
- Neoregelia 'Gillian'
- Neoregelia 'Golden Boy'
- Neoregelia 'Golden Chalice'
- Neoregelia 'Humdinger'
- Neoregelia 'Joybringer'
- Neoregelia 'Kore'
- Neoregelia 'Olly Wilson'
- Neoregelia 'Persephone'
- Neoregelia 'Sara's Sunset'
- × Niduregelia 'Anson'
