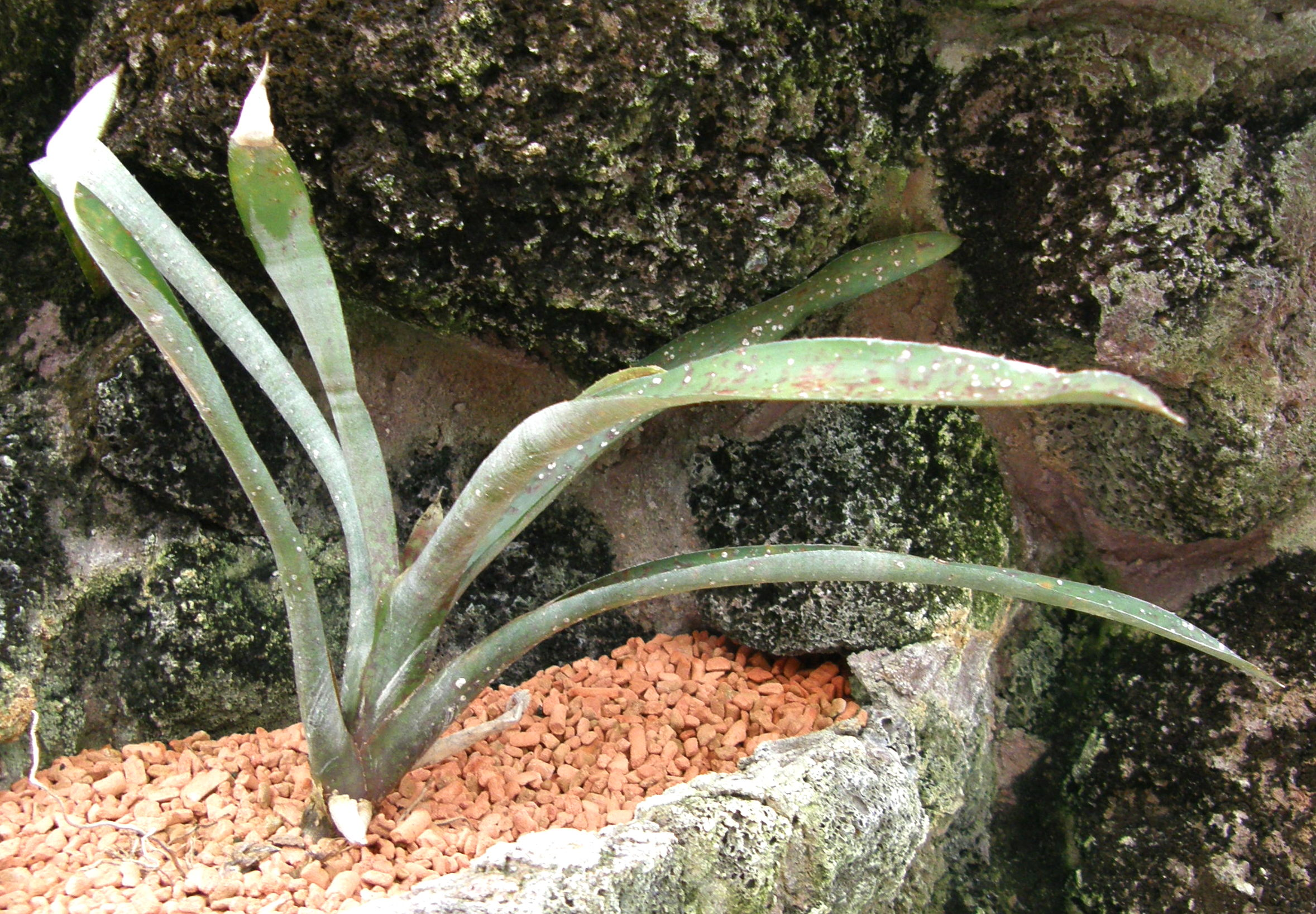

Scientific classification
- Kingdom: Plantae
- Clade: Embryophytes
- Clade: Tracheophytes
- Clade: Spermatophytes
- Clade: Angiosperms
- Clade: Monocots
- Clade: Commelinids
- Order: Poales
- Family: Bromeliaceae
- Genus: Neoregelia
- Subgenus: Neoregelia subg. Neoregelia
- Species: N. tristis

Binomial name
- Neoregelia tristis (Beer) L.B.Sm.

Synonyms
- Aregelia elegans Mez; Aregelia tristis (Beer) Mez; Bromelia tristis Beer; Karatas cyanea (Linden & André) Baker; Karatas tristis (Beer) Baker; Nidularium cyaneum Linden & André; Nidularium triste (Beer) Regel; Regelia cyanea (Linden & André) Lindm.; Regelia tristis (Beer) Lindm.

= Neoregelia tristis =

Species of flowering plant

Neoregelia tristis is a species of flowering plant in the genus Neoregelia. It is endemic to Brazil.

== Cultivars ==
- Neoregelia 'Alex D. Hawkes'
- Neoregelia 'Alpha'
- Neoregelia 'Apples and Cheese'
- Neoregelia 'Bewdy'
- Neoregelia 'Diana'
- Neoregelia 'Dr. Carl'
- Neoregelia 'Fancy Nancy'
- Neoregelia 'First Prize'
- Neoregelia 'Frances Spire (Frances)'
- Neoregelia 'Good Morning'
- Neoregelia 'Lady Di'
- Neoregelia 'Looking Good'
- Neoregelia 'Midnight'
- Neoregelia 'Mini Misso'
- Neoregelia 'Nez Misso'
- Neoregelia 'Ouija'
- Neoregelia 'Purple Magic'
- Neoregelia 'Purple Pleasure'
- Neoregelia 'Spots And Dots'
- Neoregelia 'Spotted Beauty'
- Neoregelia 'Spotty Scotty'
- Neoregelia 'Tramp'
- Neoregelia 'Violetta'
- Neoregelia 'Wow'
