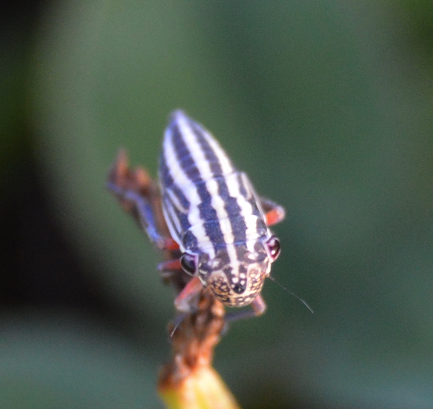

Scientific classification
- Domain: Eukaryota
- Kingdom: Animalia
- Phylum: Arthropoda
- Class: Insecta
- Order: Hemiptera
- Suborder: Auchenorrhyncha
- Family: Cicadellidae
- Subfamily: Cicadellinae
- Tribe: Proconiini
- Genus: Cuerna; Melichar, 1925

= Cuerna =

Genus of leafhoppers

Cuerna is a genus of sharpshooters in the family Cicadellidae. There are 26 species in this genus. They can be found in North America from Canada and Alaska to Panama, but the highest diversity of species is in the southwestern United States.

== Species ==
- Cuerna alba
- Cuerna alpina
- Cuerna alta
- Cuerna angusta
- Cuerna arida
- Cuerna balli
- Cuerna costalis
- Cuerna curvata
- Cuerna emeljanovi
- Cuerna fenestella
- Cuerna gladiola
- Cuerna hasbroucki
- Cuerna kaloostiani
- Cuerna krameri
- Cuerna lyrifora
- Cuerna mexicana
- Cuerna oaxacensis
- Cuerna obesa
- Cuerna obtusa
- Cuerna occidentalis
- Cuerna sayi
- Cuerna semibulba
- Cuerna stitti
- Cuerna striata
- Cuerna unica
- Cuerna yuccae
