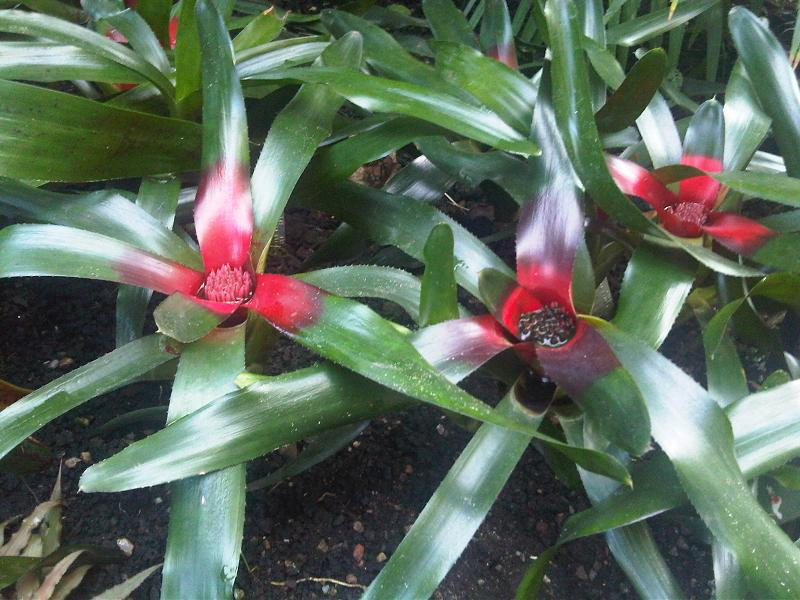

Scientific classification
- Kingdom: Plantae
- Clade: Embryophytes
- Clade: Tracheophytes
- Clade: Spermatophytes
- Clade: Angiosperms
- Clade: Monocots
- Clade: Commelinids
- Order: Poales
- Family: Bromeliaceae
- Genus: Neoregelia
- Subgenus: Neoregelia subg. Neoregelia
- Species: N. cyanea

Binomial name
- Neoregelia cyanea (Beer) L.B.Sm.

= Neoregelia cyanea =

Species of flowering plant

Neoregelia cyanea is a plant species in the genus Neoregelia. It is endemic to Brazil.

== Cultivars ==
- Neoregelia 'Angel Dust'
- Neoregelia 'Blue Angel'
- Neoregelia 'Born of Fire'
- Neoregelia 'Bromlust'
- Neoregelia 'Burgundy Angel'
- Neoregelia 'Candance'
- Neoregelia 'Carleen Isley'
- Neoregelia 'Golden Glow'
- Neoregelia 'Golden Grace'
- Neoregelia 'Golden Jewels'
- Neoregelia 'Lavender Frost'
- Neoregelia 'Little Devil'
- Neoregelia 'Louie'
- Neoregelia 'Nick Espinosa'
- Neoregelia 'Peggy B.'
- Neoregelia 'Pinkie'
- Neoregelia 'Short And Sweet'
- Neoregelia 'Sugar and Spice'
- Neoregelia 'Sun Lover'
- Neoregelia 'Sunny Delight'
- Neoregelia 'Sweet Nellie'
- Neoregelia 'Twinkie'
