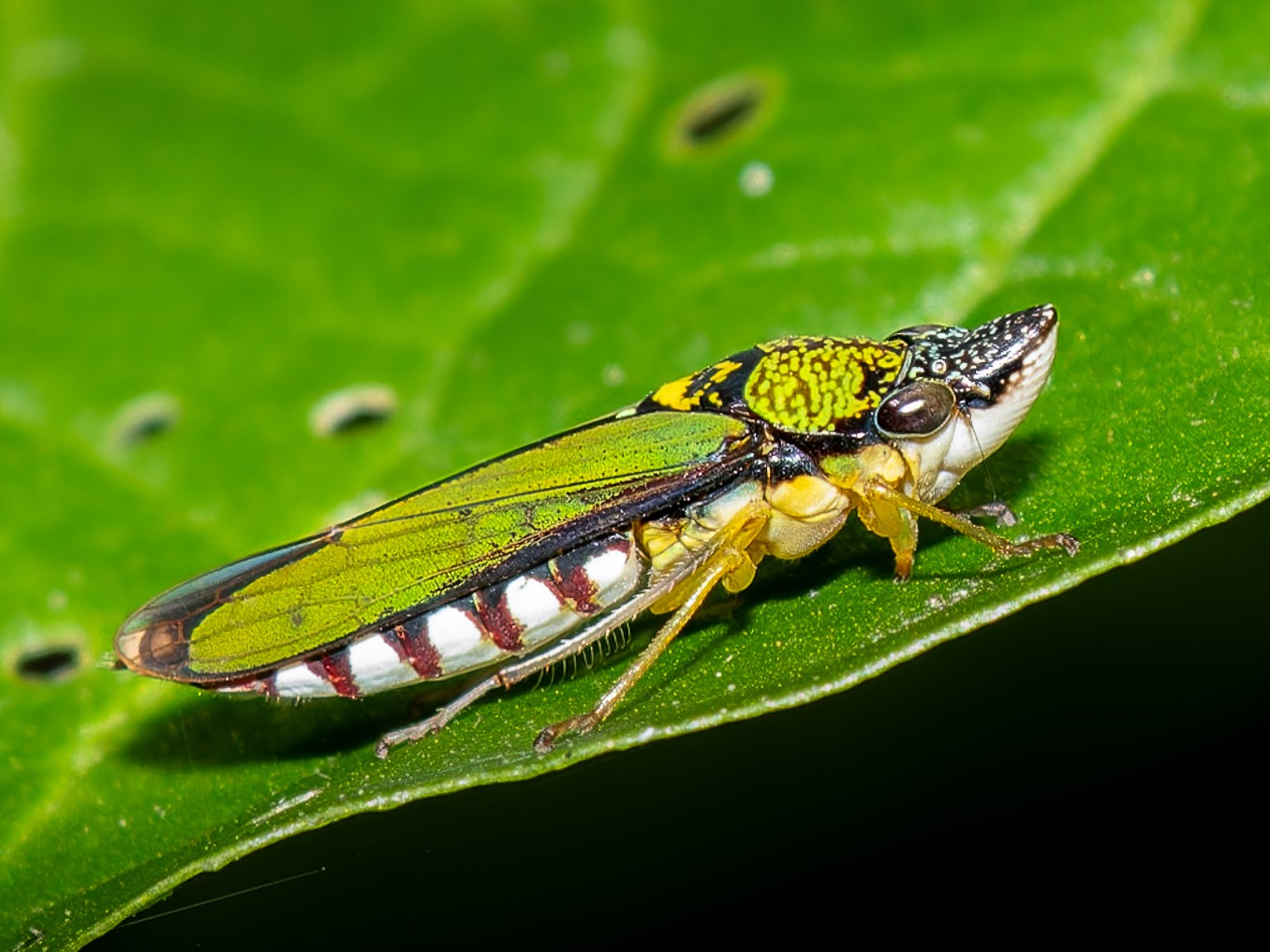
- Acrogonia virescens

Scientific classification
- Kingdom: Animalia
- Phylum: Arthropoda
- Clade: Pancrustacea
- Class: Insecta
- Order: Hemiptera
- Suborder: Auchenorrhyncha
- Family: Cicadellidae
- Subfamily: Cicadellinae
- Tribe: Proconiini
- Genus: Acrogonia; Stål, 1869

Synonyms
- List: Acragonia Stål, 1869; Acrognia Stål, 1869; Astenogonia Melichar, 1926; Orectogonia Melichar, 1926; Pherodes Fowler, 1899; Sansalvadoria Schröder, 1959

= Acrogonia =

Genus of leafhoppers

Acrogonia is a genus of neotropical sharpshooters in the family Cicadellidae.

== Species ==
The following species are recognised in the genus Acrogonia:

- Acrogonia albertoi Silva, Cavichioli, Takiya & Mejdalani, 2017
- Acrogonia amazonensis Silva, Cavichioli, Takiya & Mejdalani, 2017
- Acrogonia balloui Young, 1968
- Acrogonia barbara Silva, Cavichioli, Takiya & Mejdalani, 2017
- Acrogonia citrina Marucci & Cavichioli, 2002
- Acrogonia clarae Silva, Cavichioli, Takiya & Mejdalani, 2017
- Acrogonia dentata Silva, Cavichioli, Takiya & Mejdalani, 2018
- Acrogonia distincta Silva, Cavichioli, Takiya & Mejdalani, 2018
- Acrogonia falcata Silva, Cavichioli, Takiya & Mejdalani, 2018
- Acrogonia felixi Silva, Cavichioli, Takiya & Mejdalani, 2018
- Acrogonia filiformis Silva, Cavichioli, Takiya & Mejdalani, 2017
- Acrogonia flagellata Young, 1968
- Acrogonia flammeicolor (Fowler, 1899)
- Acrogonia flaveola (Fabricius, 1803)
- Acrogonia flaveoloides Young, 1968
- Acrogonia flavoscutellata (Signoret, 1855)
- Acrogonia gracilis (Osborn, 1926)
- Acrogonia hastata (Walker, 1858)
- Acrogonia ignota Young, 1968
- Acrogonia interrupta Silva, Cavichioli, Takiya & Mejdalani, 2017
- Acrogonia izzardi Young, 1968
- Acrogonia libidinosa (Signoret, 1862)
- Acrogonia lobulata Silva, Cavichioli, Takiya & Mejdalani, 2018
- Acrogonia luizi Silva, Cavichioli, Takiya & Mejdalani, 2018
- Acrogonia nigriceps (Signoret, 1855)
- Acrogonia obscurior (Fowler, 1899)
- Acrogonia plana (Fabricius, 1787)
- Acrogonia pustulata (Fabricius, 1803)
- Acrogonia quintasi Silva, Cavichioli, Takiya & Mejdalani, 2018
- Acrogonia rostrata (Signoret, 1855)
- Acrogonia sagittarius (Walker, 1858)
- Acrogonia salax (Signoret, 1862)
- Acrogonia sparsuta (Signoret, 1855)
- Acrogonia stylata Young, 1968
- Acrogonia tenuis Silva, Cavichioli, Takiya & Mejdalani, 2017
- Acrogonia terminalis Young, 1968
- Acrogonia tridentata Young, 1968
- Acrogonia virescens (Metcalf, 1949)
- Acrogonia youngi Silva, Cavichioli, Takiya & Mejdalani, 2017
