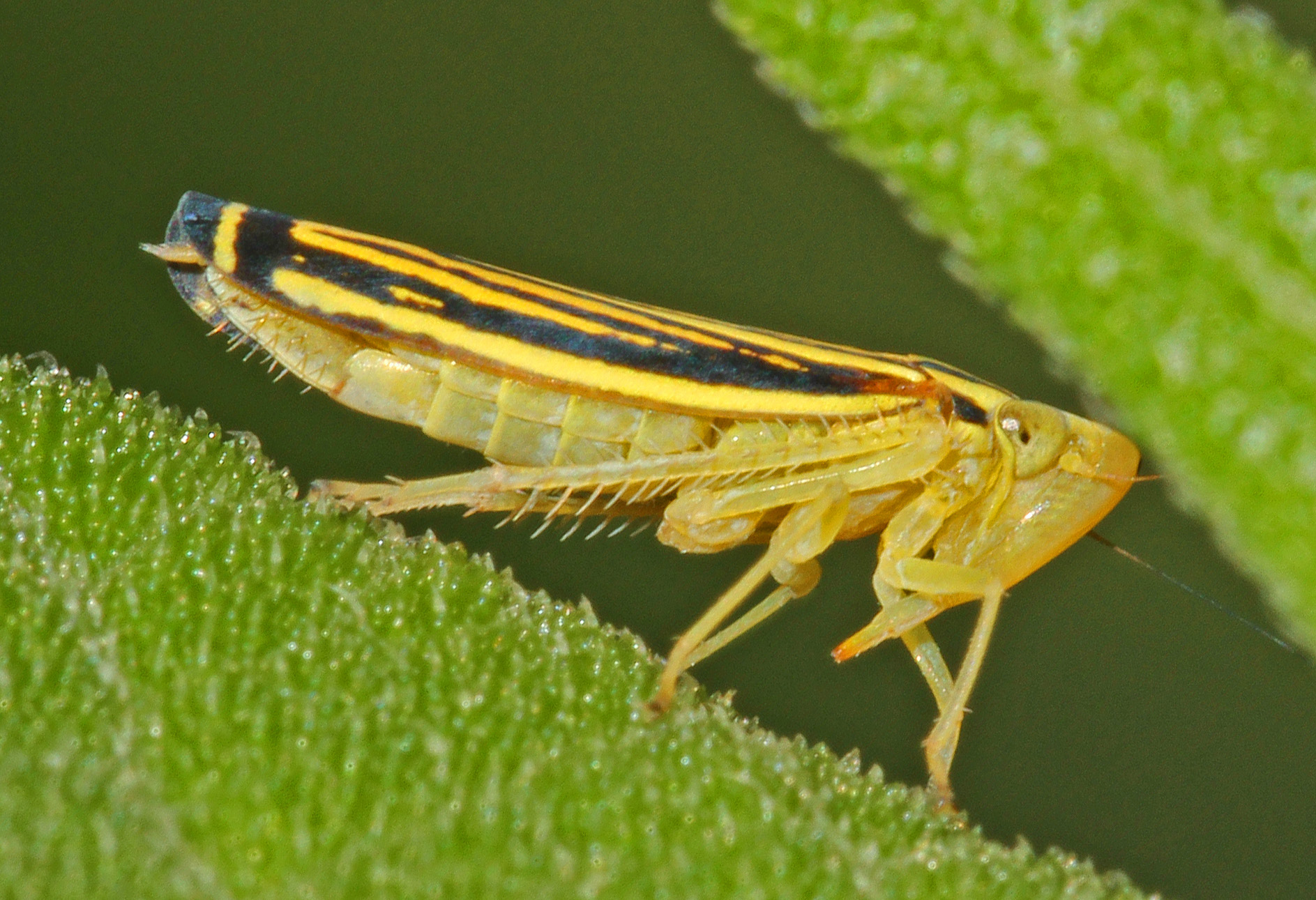
- Sibovia occatoria

Scientific classification
- Domain: Eukaryota
- Kingdom: Animalia
- Phylum: Arthropoda
- Class: Insecta
- Order: Hemiptera
- Suborder: Auchenorrhyncha
- Family: Cicadellidae
- Tribe: Cicadellini
- Genus: Sibovia; China, 1927

= Sibovia =

Genus of leafhoppers

Sibovia is a genus of leafhoppers in the family Cicadellidae. There are at least 30 described species in Sibovia.

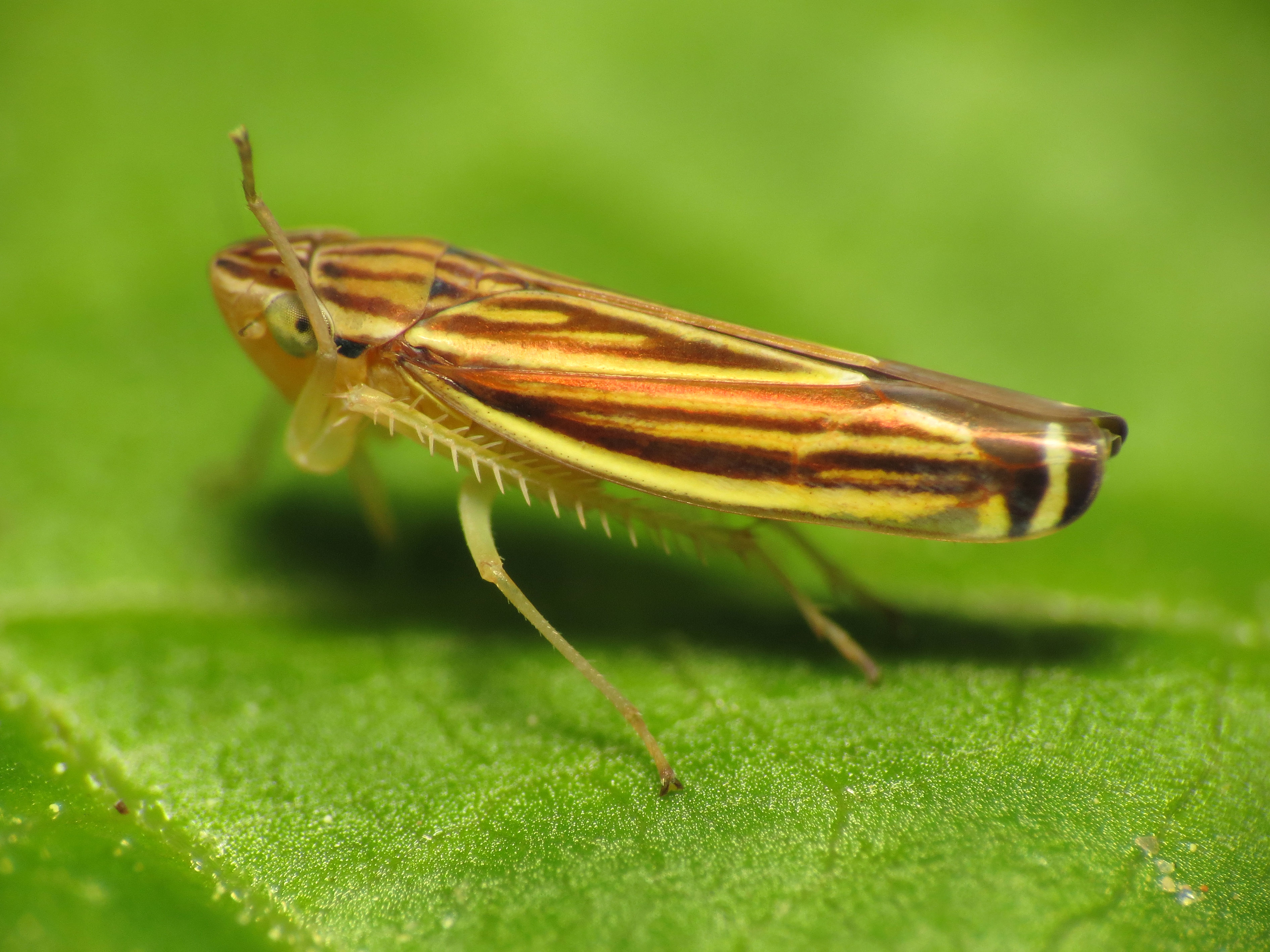
Sibovia occatoria

== Species ==
- Sibovia aprica (Melichar, 1926)^{c g}
- Sibovia carahua Young, 1977^{c g}
- Sibovia chanchama Young, 1977^{c g}
- Sibovia civilis (Fowler, 1900)^{c g}
- Sibovia composita (Fowler, 1900)^{c g}
- Sibovia compta Fowler, 1900^{c g b}
- Sibovia conferta (Melichar, 1926)^{c g}
- Sibovia conjuncta (Melichar, 1926)^{c g}
- Sibovia corona Nielson & Godoy, 1995^{c g}
- Sibovia festana Young, 1977^{c g}
- Sibovia huasima Young, 1977^{c g}
- Sibovia improvisula Young, 1977^{c g}
- Sibovia inexpectata (Metcalf & Bruner, 1936)^{c g}
- Sibovia infula (Melichar, 1926)^{c g}
- Sibovia mesolinea (DeLong & Currie, 1959)^{c g}
- Sibovia nielsoni Young, 1977^{c g}
- Sibovia occaminis Young, 1977^{c g}
- Sibovia occatoria Say, 1830^{c g b}
- Sibovia optabilis (Melichar, 1926)^{c g}
- Sibovia picchitula Young, 1977^{c g}
- Sibovia pileata (Fowler, 1900)^{c g}
- Sibovia praevia (Melichar, 1926)^{c g}
- Sibovia prodigiosa (Melichar, 1926)^{c g}
- Sibovia recta (Fowler, 1900)^{c g}
- Sibovia sagata (Signoret, 1854)^{c g}
- Sibovia skeeleae Young, 1977^{c g}
- Sibovia sororia (Fowler, 1900)^{c g}
- Sibovia taeniatifrons (Schmidt, E., 1928)^{c g}
- Sibovia tunicata (Fowler, 1900)^{c g}
- Sibovia youngi Nielson & Godoy, 1995^{c g}

Data sources: i = ITIS, c = Catalogue of Life, g = GBIF, b = Bugguide.net
