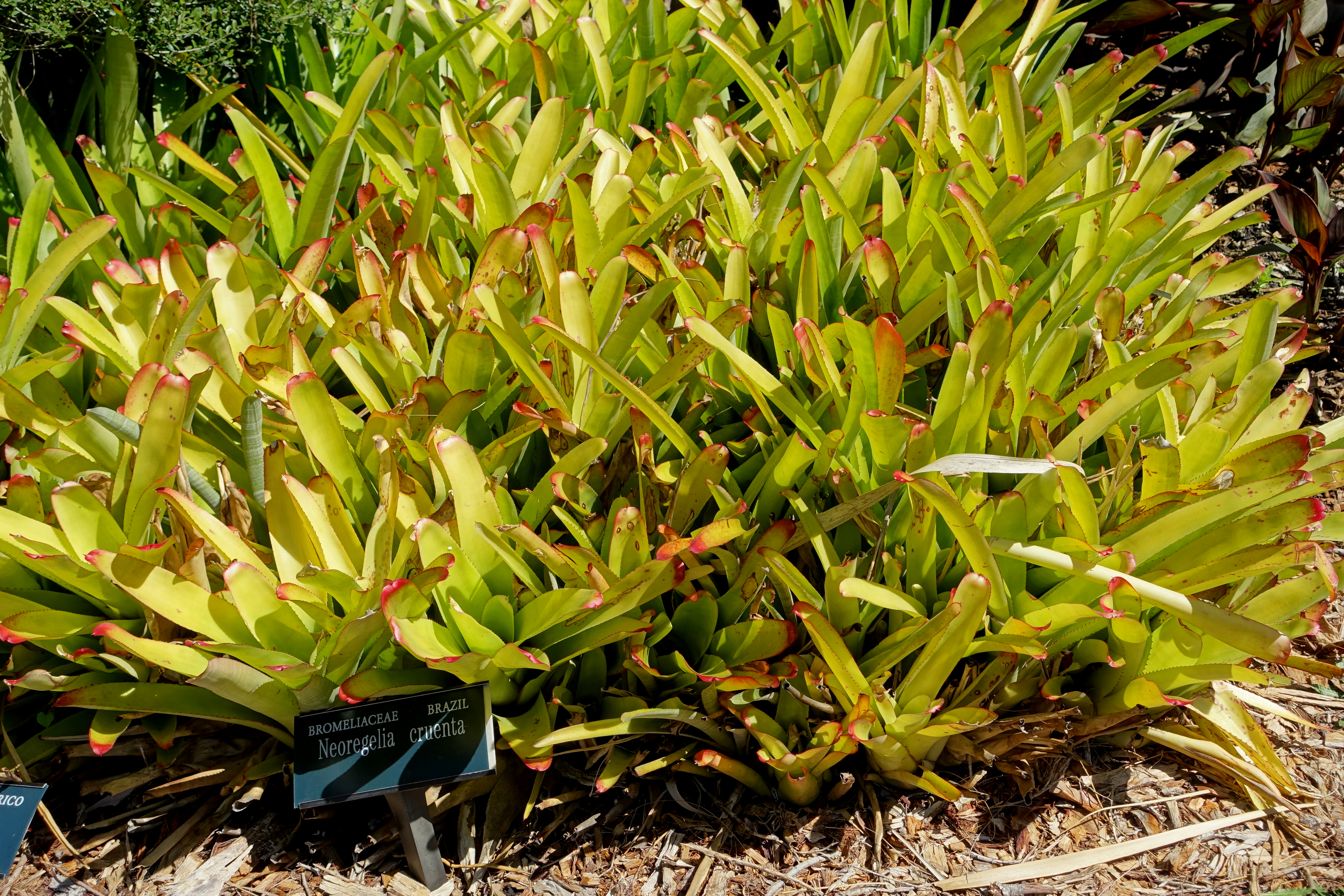

Scientific classification
- Kingdom: Plantae
- Clade: Embryophytes
- Clade: Tracheophytes
- Clade: Spermatophytes
- Clade: Angiosperms
- Clade: Monocots
- Clade: Commelinids
- Order: Poales
- Family: Bromeliaceae
- Genus: Neoregelia
- Subgenus: Neoregelia subg. Neoregelia
- Species: N. cruenta

Binomial name
- Neoregelia cruenta (Graham) L.B.Sm.

= Neoregelia cruenta =

Species of flowering plant

Neoregelia cruenta is a species of flowering plant in the genus Neoregelia. It is endemic to Brazil.

== Cultivars ==
- Neoregelia 'BOS'
- Neoregelia 'Carioca'
- Neoregelia 'Dreams'
- Neoregelia 'Elen Zurita'
- Neoregelia 'Goldilocks'
- Neoregelia 'Hilda Ariza'
- Neoregelia 'Iron Maiden'
- Neoregelia 'Karamea Bon Ton'
- Neoregelia 'Karamea Mattino'
- Neoregelia 'Karamea Shadows'
- Neoregelia 'Kitty Ariza'
- Neoregelia 'Laelia'
- Neoregelia 'Mongold'
- Neoregelia 'Natascha'
- Neoregelia 'Noble Descent'
- Neoregelia 'Oso Proud'
- Neoregelia 'Pink Champagne'
- Neoregelia 'Pink Coral'
- Neoregelia 'Red Sport'
- Neoregelia 'Rojoverde'
- Neoregelia 'Rubra'
- Neoregelia 'Sun King'
