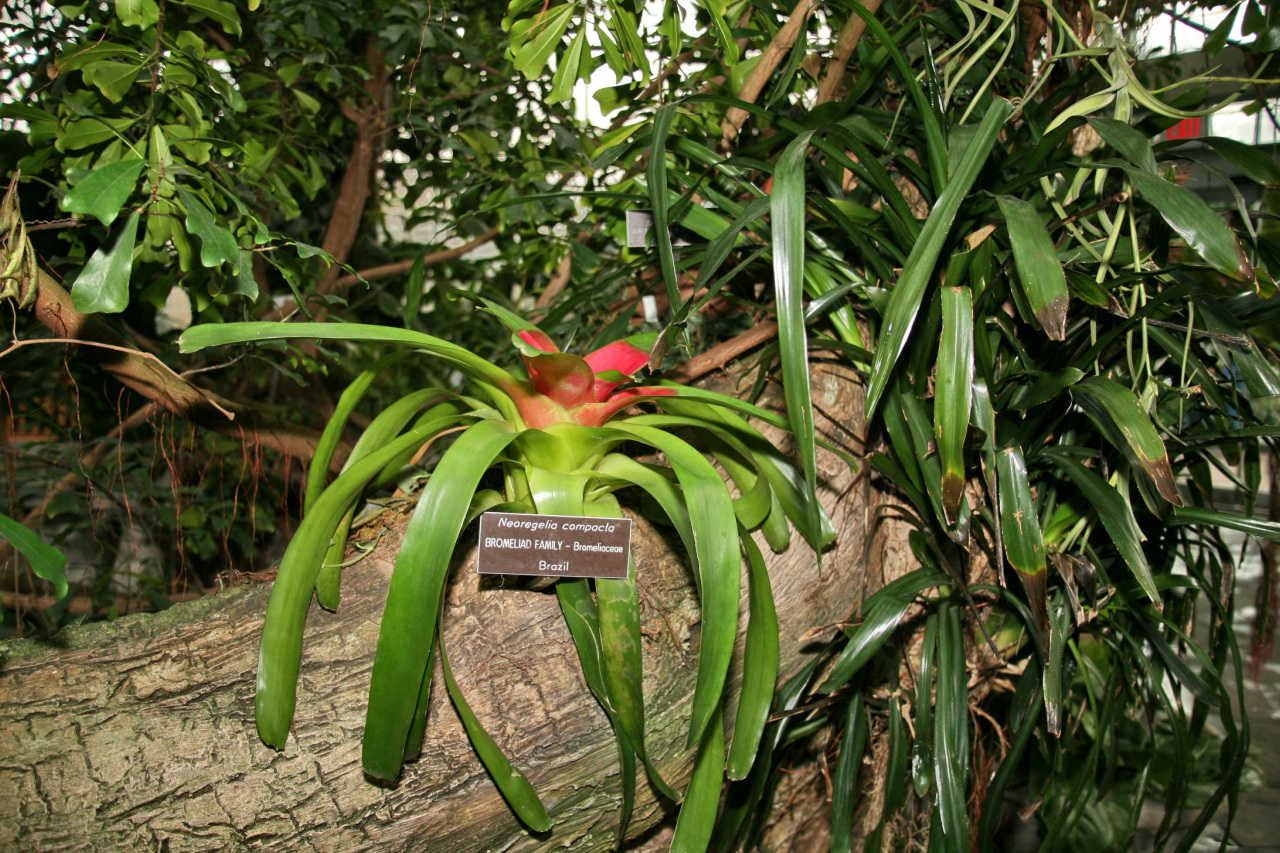

Scientific classification
- Kingdom: Plantae
- Clade: Embryophytes
- Clade: Tracheophytes
- Clade: Spermatophytes
- Clade: Angiosperms
- Clade: Monocots
- Clade: Commelinids
- Order: Poales
- Family: Bromeliaceae
- Genus: Neoregelia
- Subgenus: Neoregelia subg. Neoregelia
- Species: N. compacta

Binomial name
- Neoregelia compacta (Mez) L.B.Sm.

Synonyms
- Homotypic Synonyms: Aregelia compacta (Mez) Mez; Nidularium compactum Mez

= Neoregelia compacta =

Species of flowering plant

Neoregelia compacta is a species of flowering plant in the family Neoregelia. It is endemic to Brazil.

== Cultivars ==
- Neoregelia 'Alpha'
- Neoregelia 'Black Heart'
- Neoregelia 'Bossa Nova'
- Neoregelia 'Candelabra'
- Neoregelia 'Clotho'
- Neoregelia 'Crown Prince'
- Neoregelia 'Eleanor'
- Neoregelia 'Fire Nymph'
- Neoregelia 'Fire Pixie'
- Neoregelia 'Fire Sprite'
- Neoregelia 'Geisha Girl'
- Neoregelia 'Huckelberry Finn'
- Neoregelia 'Jazz'
- Neoregelia 'Milky Way'
- Neoregelia 'Pacquito'
- Neoregelia 'Red Rover'
- Neoregelia 'Royal Robe'
- Neoregelia 'Summer Of '42'
- Neoregelia 'Super Fireball'
- Neoregelia 'Warren Loose'
- Neoregelia 'Windflower'
