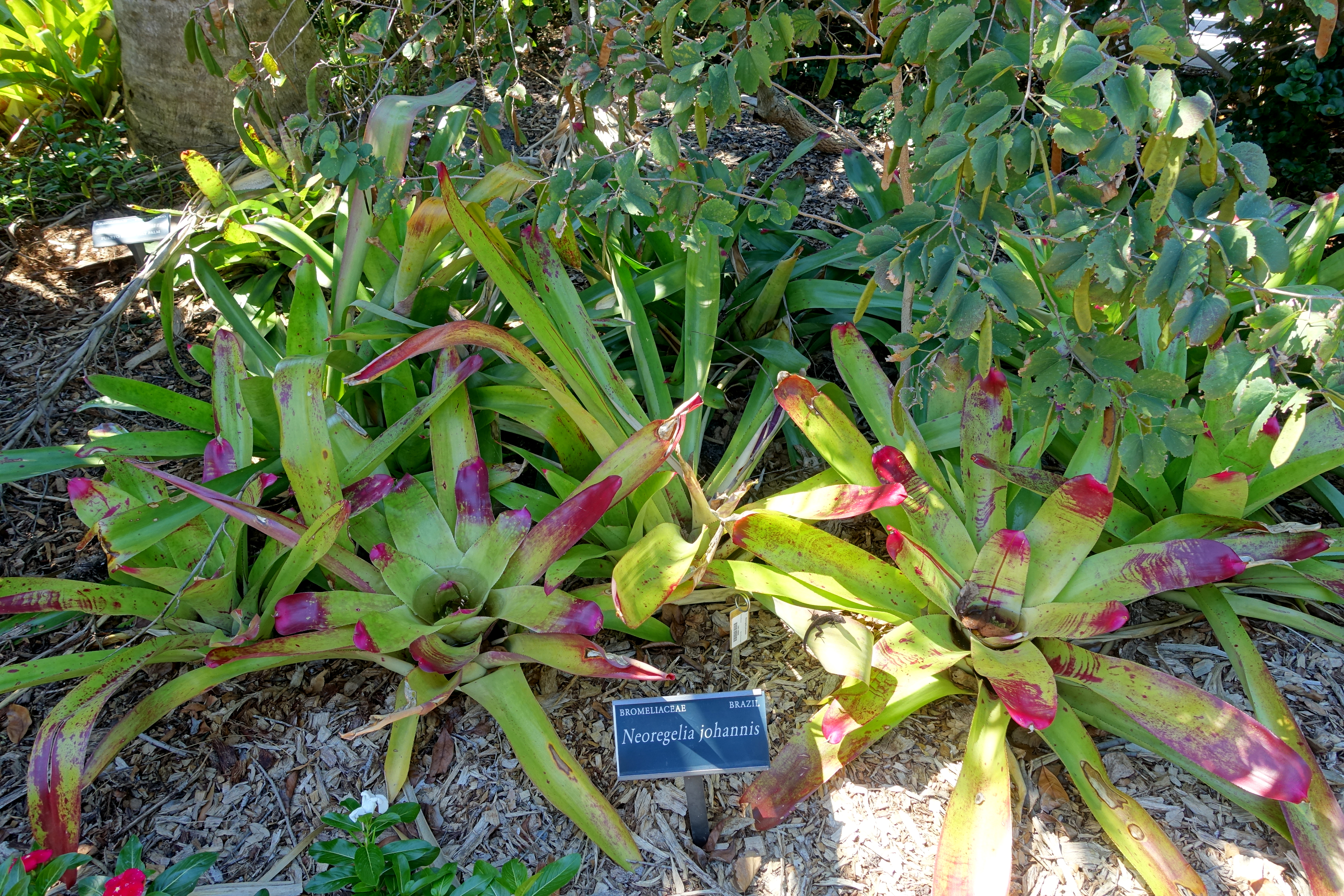

Scientific classification
- Kingdom: Plantae
- Clade: Embryophytes
- Clade: Tracheophytes
- Clade: Spermatophytes
- Clade: Angiosperms
- Clade: Monocots
- Clade: Commelinids
- Order: Poales
- Family: Bromeliaceae
- Genus: Neoregelia
- Subgenus: Neoregelia subg. Neoregelia
- Species: N. johannis

Binomial name
- Neoregelia johannis (Carrière) L.B.Sm.

= Neoregelia johannis =

Species of flowering plant

Neoregelia johannis is a species of flowering plant in the genus Neoregelia. It is endemic to Brazil.

== Cultivars ==
- Neoregelia 'Autumn Leaves'
- Neoregelia 'Avalanche'
- Neoregelia 'Bertie'
- Neoregelia 'Big Flamingo'
- Neoregelia 'Buccaneer'
- Neoregelia 'Carol Johnson'
- Neoregelia 'DeRolf'
- Neoregelia 'Dreamworthy'
- Neoregelia 'Earthrose'
- Neoregelia 'Exotica Pink Panther'
- Neoregelia 'Fairchild'
- Neoregelia 'Florida'
- Neoregelia 'Foster's Bronze Speckled'
- Neoregelia 'Foster's Pink Tip'
- Neoregelia 'Foster's Red Tip'
- Neoregelia 'French's Cruenta'
- Neoregelia 'Golden Gem'
- Neoregelia 'Green Jewels'
- Neoregelia 'Joey'
- Neoregelia 'Karamea Indian Chief'
- Neoregelia 'Karamea Raspberry Crush'
- Neoregelia 'King Kameahameha'
- Neoregelia 'Lady Killer'
- Neoregelia 'Lady Linda'
- Neoregelia 'Lavender Flair'
- Neoregelia 'Little Julie'
- Neoregelia 'Maricela'
- Neoregelia 'Overture'
- Neoregelia 'Passion'
- Neoregelia 'Peregrine'
- Neoregelia 'Pink Cup'
- Neoregelia 'Pink Tip(s)'
- Neoregelia 'Pride of Place'
- Neoregelia 'Red Band'
- Neoregelia 'Red Baron'
- Neoregelia 'Red Best'
- Neoregelia 'Royal Flush'
- Neoregelia 'Royal Grande'
- Neoregelia 'Samson'
- Neoregelia 'Sendero'
- Neoregelia 'Songlines'
- Neoregelia 'Strawberry Blush'
- Neoregelia 'Summer Wind'
- Neoregelia 'Takizawa Princeps'
- Neoregelia 'Tapestry'
- Neoregelia 'Tops'
- Neoregelia 'Triumph'
- Neoregelia 'Vulkan'
- Neoregelia 'White Joe'
- Neoregelia 'White Johannis'
- × Neomea 'Shooting Star'
