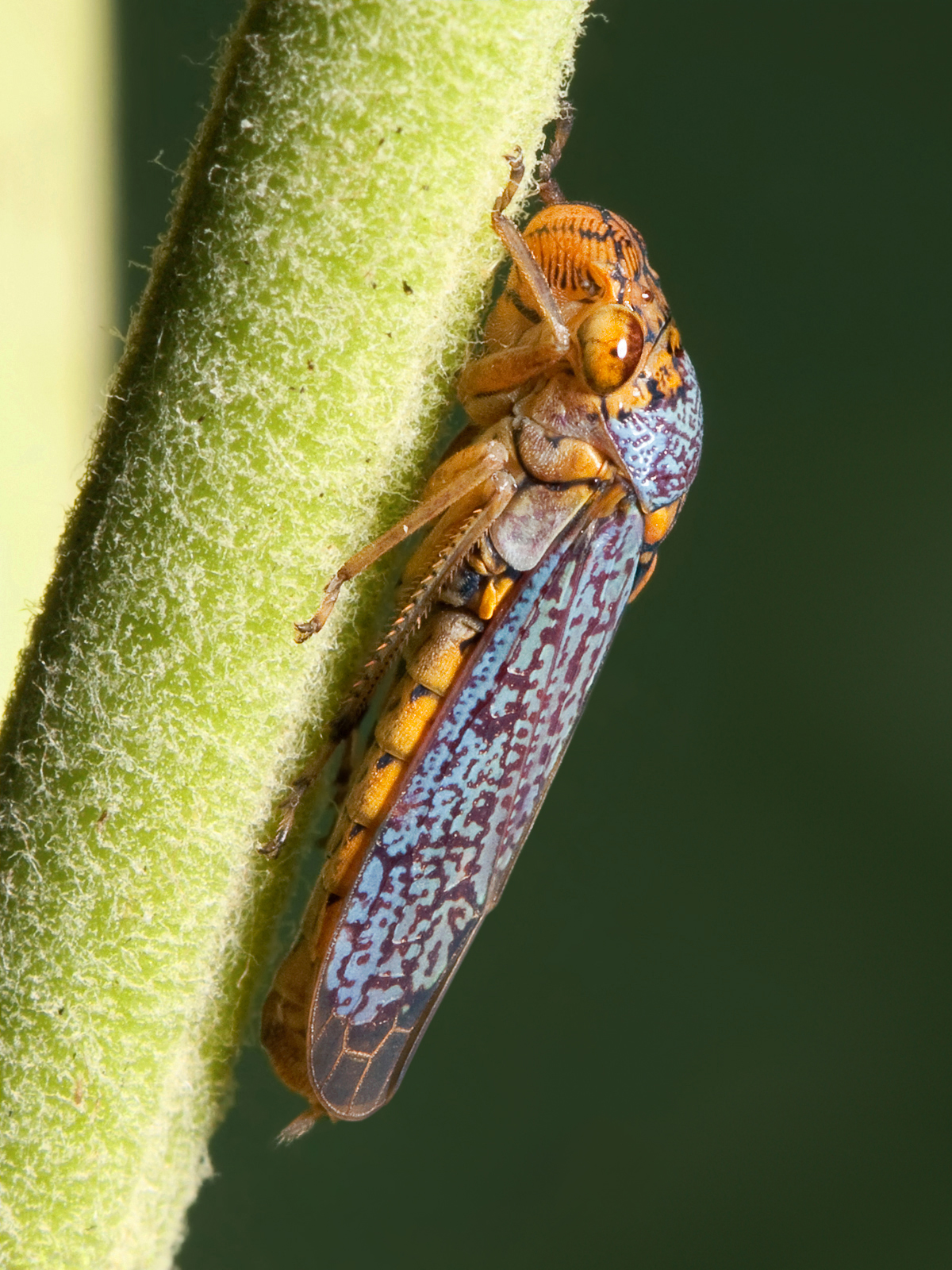
- Oncometopia orbona

Scientific classification
- Kingdom: Animalia
- Phylum: Arthropoda
- Class: Insecta
- Order: Hemiptera
- Suborder: Auchenorrhyncha
- Family: Cicadellidae
- Subfamily: Cicadellinae
- Tribe: Proconiini
- Genus: Oncometopia; Stål, 1869

= Oncometopia =

Genus of leafhoppers

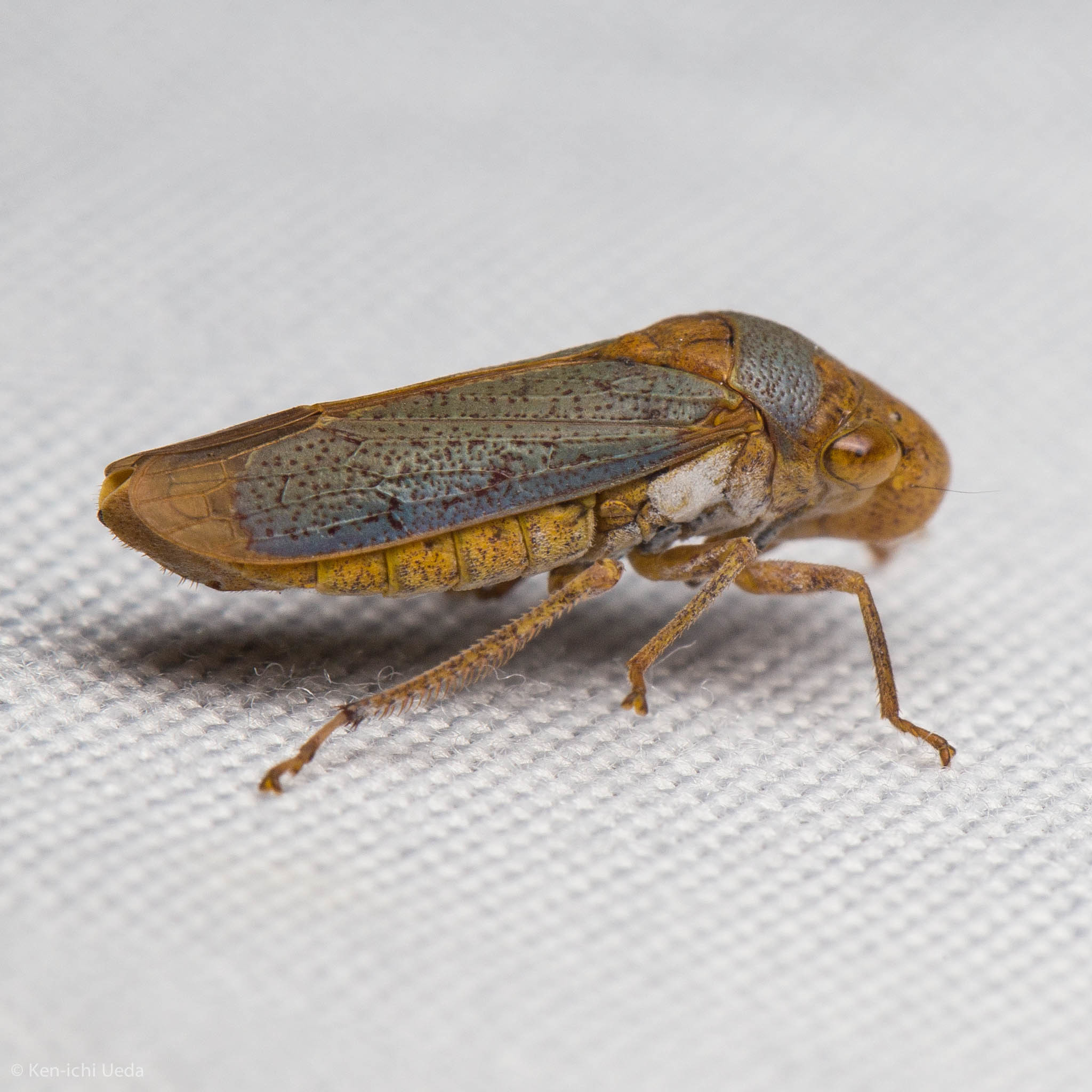
Oncometopia hamiltoni

Oncometopia is a genus of sharpshooters found in North and South America. The genus was erected by Carl Stål in 1869.

== Description ==
Oncometopia range from 9.4 mm to 15.0 mm in length.

The head is moderately produced with a median length almost always less than the interocular width. The anterior margin of the head is rounded dorsally and the crown is rounded to the face without a carina in between. The ocelli are each roughly equidistant from the median line of the crown and the adjacent anterior eye angle (alternatively, they may be slightly closer to the latter). The disc usually has short sparse pubescence (hairs). The antennal ledges each have longitudinal fovea and are carinate dorsally, and the anterior margins are oblique. The clypeus is strongly convex (except in female O. fuscipennis) and its dorsomedial surface is coarsely granular.

The thorax has the pronotal disc punctate and usually rugose. The proepimeron is wider than long. The posterior portion of the scutellum is almost always without transverse striae.

The forewing is coriaceous (leathery) and has an apical membrane. The veins are distinct. The surface is often punctate. The claval veins are parallel, approximate, contiguous or fused near their midlength. The hindwing generally resembles that of the related genus Phera.

The tibiae of the forelegs are not or only slightly dilated apically. The hindlegs have the first tarsomeres varying from shorter than to longer than the combined length of second and third tarsomeres.

== Selected species ==
- Oncometopia facialis
- Oncometopia hamiltoni
- Oncometopia alpha
- Oncometopia clarior
- Oncometopia nigricans
- Oncometopia orbona - broad-headed sharpshooter

== Economic importance ==
The species O. orbona is one of the two primary natural vectors of Xylella fastidiosa subsp. multiplex, which causes phony peach disease. Similarly, O. facialis is a vector of X. fastidiosa subsp. pauca, which causes citrus variegated chlorosis.
