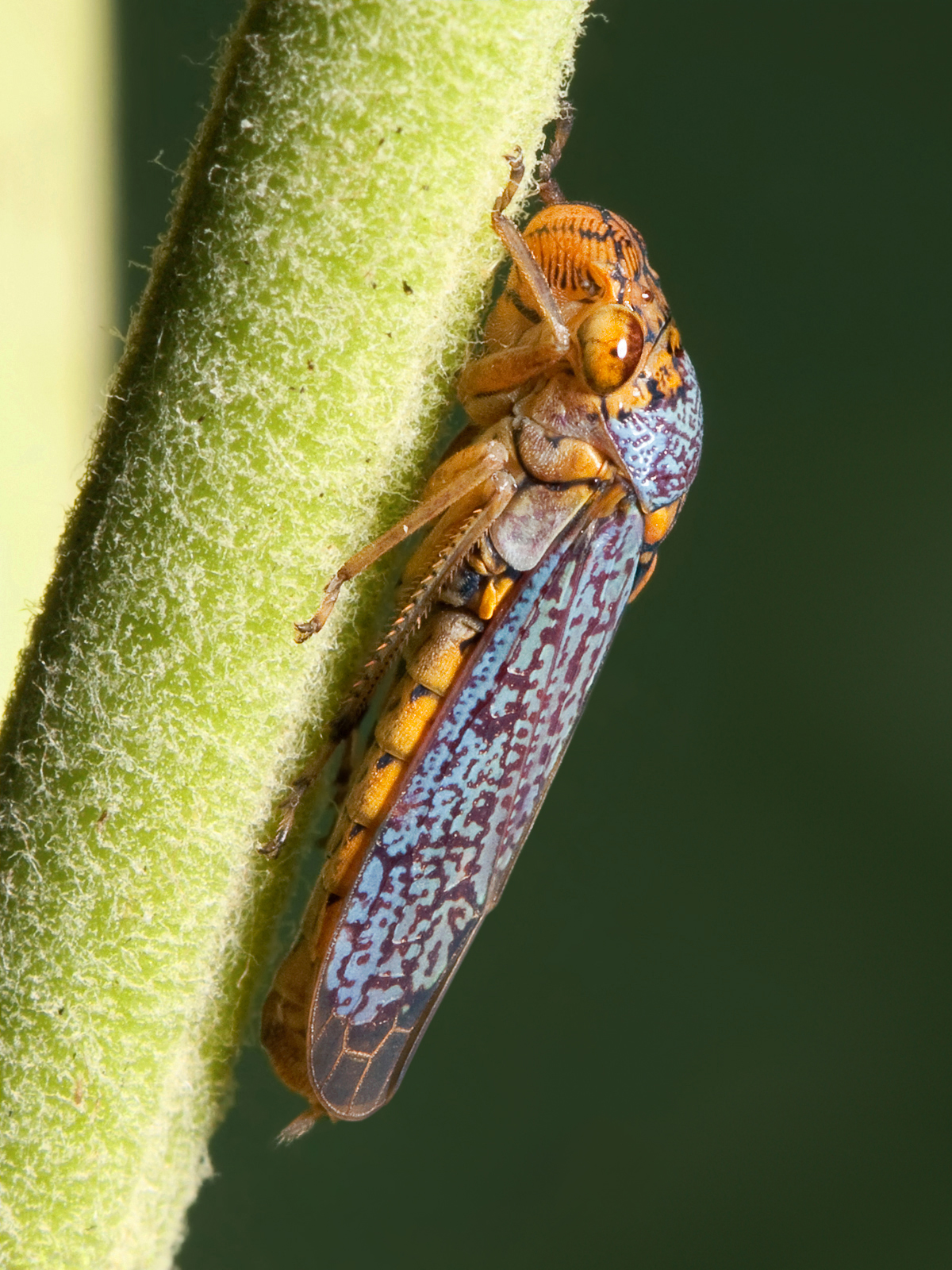
- Oncometopia orbona

Scientific classification
- Kingdom: Animalia
- Phylum: Arthropoda
- Clade: Pancrustacea
- Class: Insecta
- Order: Hemiptera
- Suborder: Auchenorrhyncha
- Family: Cicadellidae
- Subfamily: Cicadellinae
- Tribe: Proconiini; Stål, 1869

Genera
- See text

Synonyms
- Proconiinae Distant, 1879; Proconiidae Brues & Melander, 1915; Ciccini Baker, 1915

= Sharpshooter (insect) =

Tribe of true bugs

The name sharpshooter is used to refer to any of various genera and species of large leafhoppers in the tribe Proconiini of the family Cicadellidae; they are mostly found in the Americas. As with all cicadellids, they have piercing-sucking mouthparts and closely spaced rows of fine spines on their hind legs. The nymphs feed by inserting their needle-like mouthparts into the xylem of the small stems on the plant where the eggs were deposited; the adults have wings and are highly mobile, and most feed on a variety of different plant species. Both nymphs and adults filter a huge volume of dilute liquid through their digestive system to extract the trace nutrients, and much of the water and carbohydrates are squirted forcibly away from the body in a fine stream of droplets, thus earning them their common name.

This group includes a few species which are plant pests, the most serious of which is Homalodisca vitripennis (glassy-winged sharpshooter). A bacterial plant pathogen, Xylella fastidiosa, is carried by this species, and is linked to many plant diseases, including phoney peach disease in the southern United States, oleander leaf scorch and Pierce's disease in California, and citrus X disease (citrus variegated chlorosis) in Brazil.

Homalodisca coagulata virus-1 (HoCV-1) is a sharpshooter virus, in the family Dicistroviridae.

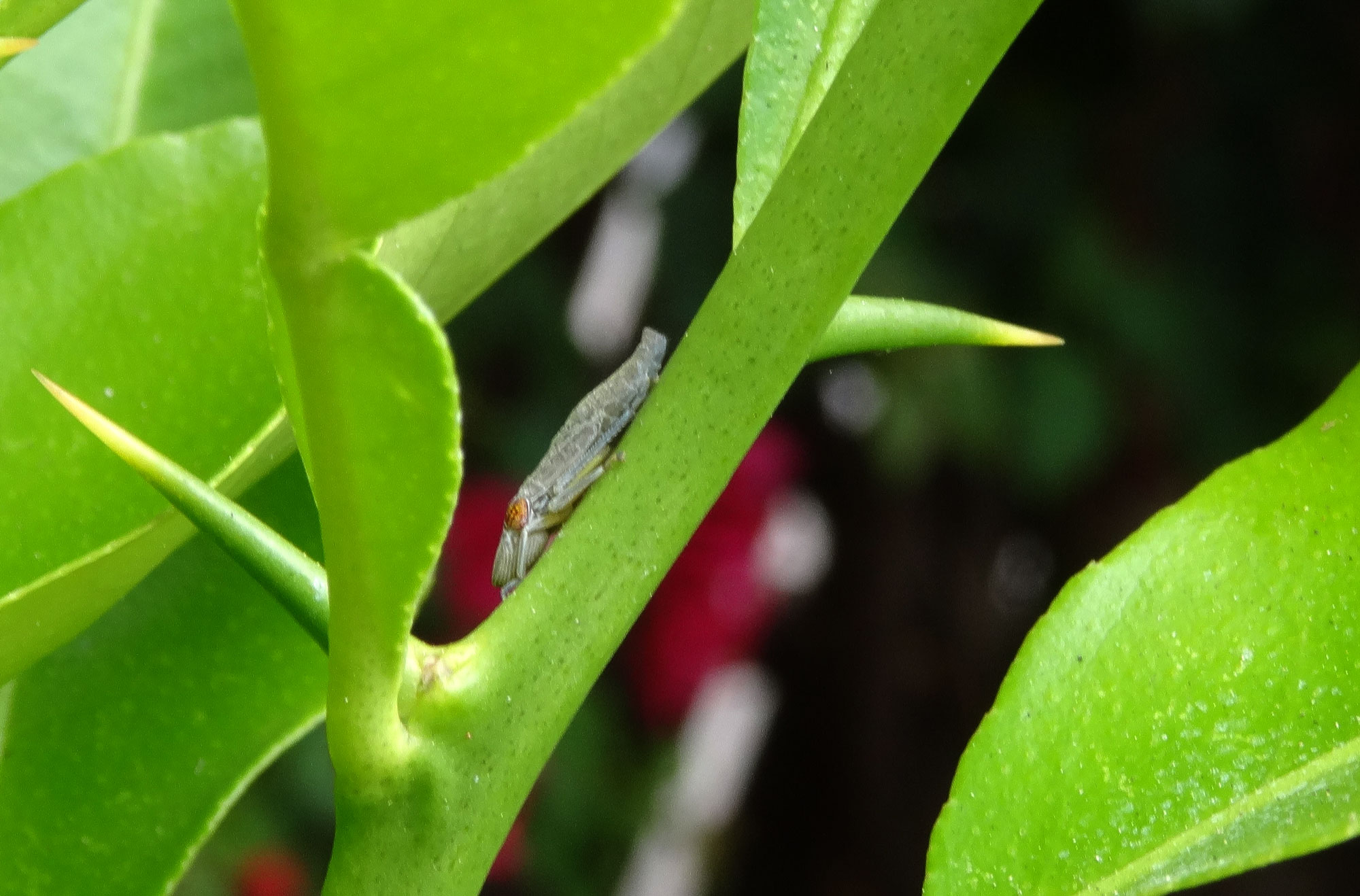
Nymph form of Sharpshooter leafhopper

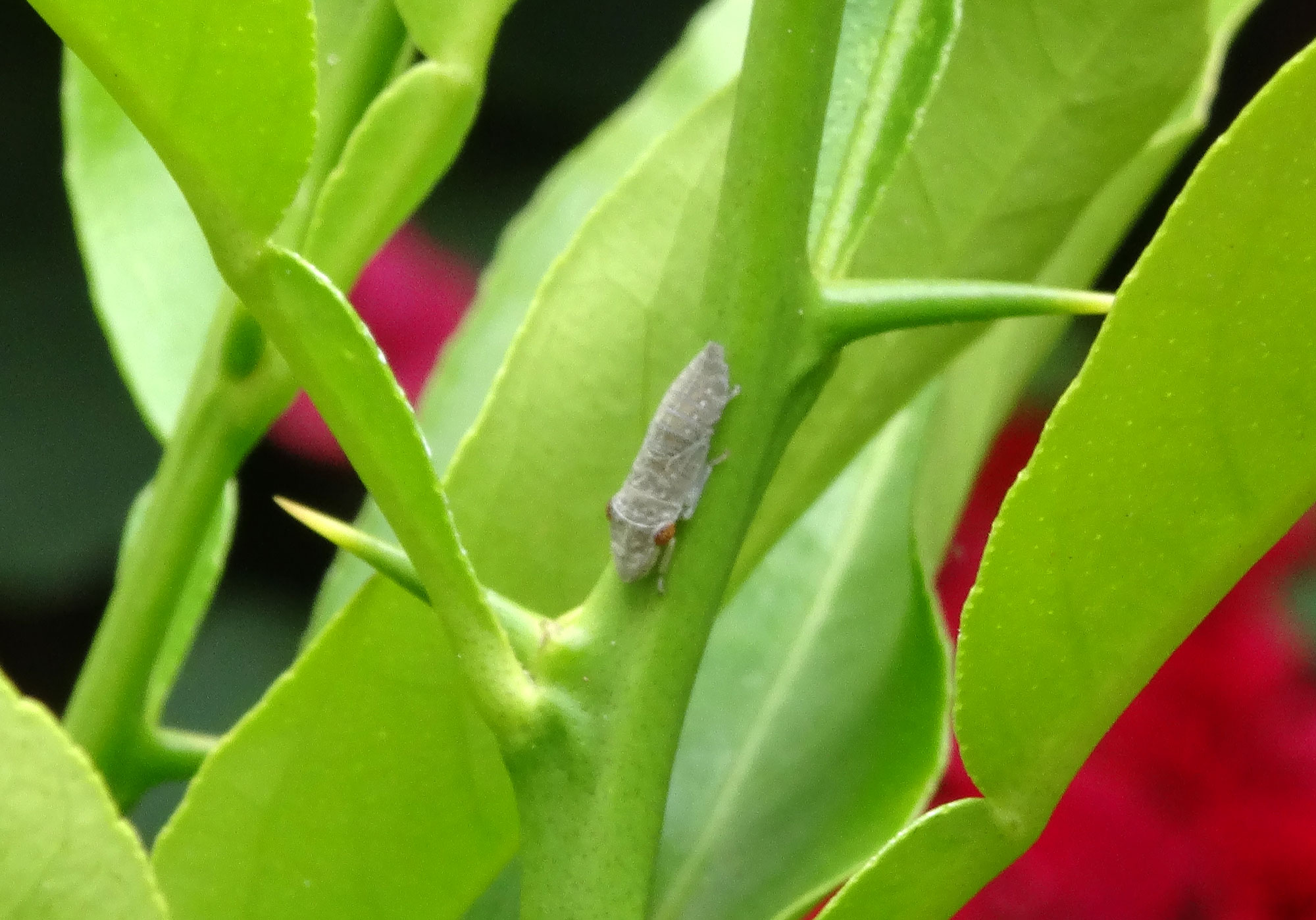
Nymph form of Sharpshooter leafhopper

== Genera ==
Abana - Acrobelus - Acrocampsa - Acrogonia - Amblydisca - Anacrocampsa - Anacuerna - Aulacizes - Catorthorrinus - Cicciana - Ciccus - Cleusiana - Cuerna - Cyrtodisca - Dechacona - Depanana - Depanisca - Desamera - Deselvana - Dichrophleps - Dictyodisca - Diestostemma - Egidemia - Homalodisca - Homoscarta - Hyogonia - Ichthyobelus - Lojata - Mareba - Molomea - Ochrostacta - Omagua - Oncometopia - Paracrocampsa - Paraulacizes - Peltocheiras - Phera - Procama - Procandea - Proconia - Proconobola - Proconopera - Proconosama - Propectes - Pseudometopia - Pseudophera - Quichira - Rhaphirrhinus - Splonia - Strictoscarta - Tapajosa - Teletusa - Tretogonia - Yotala - Yunga - Zyzzogeton
