= List of plants with dehiscent fruits =

This is a list of species of plants having a specialized seed dispersal characteristic known as dehiscence in their or plant genera where dehiscent fruit is a defining characteristic.

In order for plant species articles to be included in the list they should meet the following criteria:

1. dehiscence in the fruit of the species is mentioned at least once;
2. a citation makes explicit reference to the species having dehiscent fruit.

In order for plant genus articles to be included in the list they should meet the following criteria:

1. dehiscence in the fruit of species of the genus is mentioned at least once;
2. a citation which makes explicit reference to the said genus having dehiscent fruit;
3. all or at least most of its species display dehiscence in their fruit.

== List of plants with dehiscent fruits ==
- Aquilegia
- Asclepias
- Bulbophyllum
- Cinchona
- Coopernookia
- Cynanchum
- Darlingtonia californica
- Dipodium
- Drosera
- Exochorda
- Forstera
- Franklinia
- Genlisea
- Gentianaceae
- Heliamphora
- Hesperis matronalis
- Hesperoyucca
- Hura crepitans
- Kageneckia
- Lindleya
- Lunaria annua
- Papaver
- Peony
- Phlox
- Populus
- Rhododendron
- Rorippa palustris
- Sarracenia
- Spiraea
- Stylidium
- Vauquelinia
- Vella (plant)
- Venus flytrap
- Zuccagnia

== See also ==
- List of plants with indehiscent fruits
