= C. imbricata =

C. imbricata may refer to:

- Clarkia imbricata, the Vine Hill clarkia, a rare flowering plant species endemic to Sonoma County, California
- Cyathea imbricata, a tree fern species endemic to western New Guinea
- Cylindropuntia imbricata, the cane cholla, walking stick cholla, tree cholla or chainlink cactus, a cactus species found in arid parts of North America
- Concavodonta imbricata, an Ordovician age bivalve from Northern Ireland

== Synonyms ==
- Candollea imbricata, a synonym for Stylidium imbricatum, a plant species

== See also ==
- Imbricata
