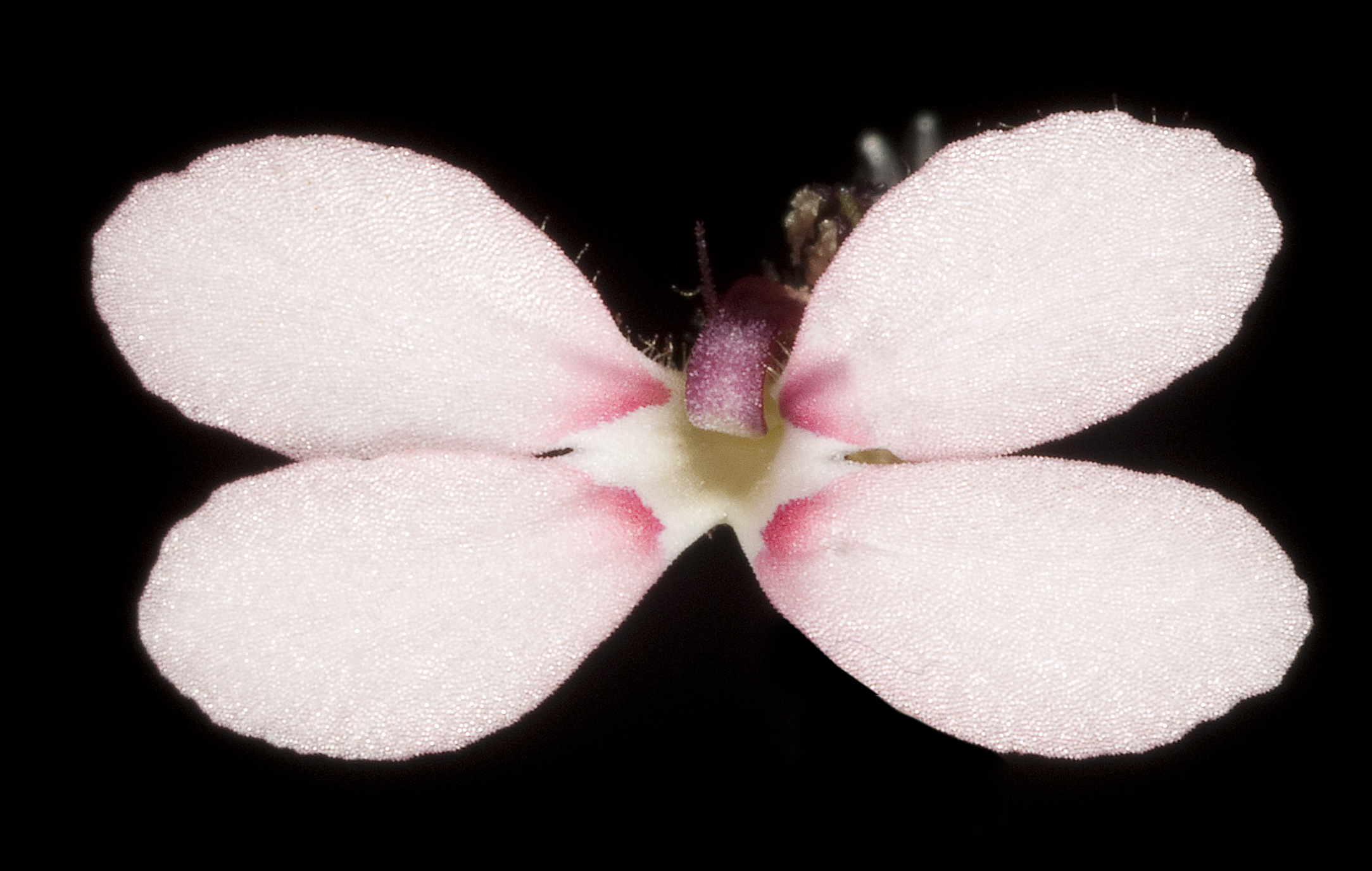

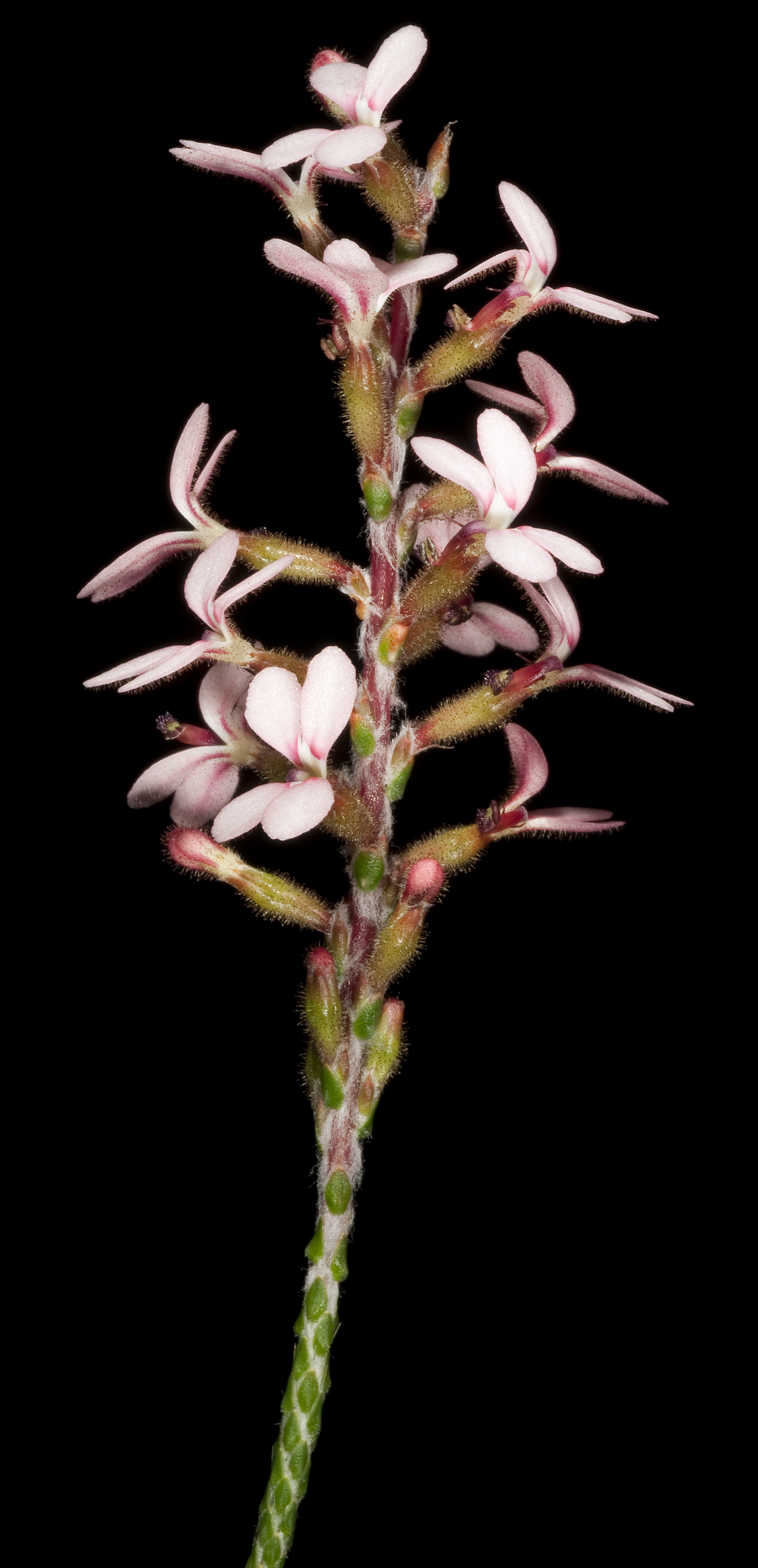

Conservation status
- Priority Three — Poorly Known Taxa (DEC)

Scientific classification
- Kingdom: Plantae
- Clade: Tracheophytes
- Clade: Angiosperms
- Clade: Eudicots
- Clade: Asterids
- Order: Asterales
- Family: Stylidiaceae
- Genus: Stylidium
- Subgenus: Stylidium subg. Forsteropsis
- Species: S. marradongense

Binomial name
- Stylidium marradongense Lowrie & Kenneally 1997

= Stylidium marradongense =

Species of carnivorous plant

Stylidium marradongense is a species that belongs to the genus Stylidium (family Stylidiaceae). The specific epithet marradongense refers to the Marradong region in Western Australia where the species is located. It is an herbaceous perennial that grows from 15 to 50 cm tall and has divided stems covered with tile-like leaves that are arranged in a spiral formation around the stem. The lanceolate leaves are basifixed and held closely against the stems. The leaves are around 1.5-2.0 mm long and 0.5-0.8 mm wide. Terminal inflorescences are racemose or spike-like and produce flowers that are shades of pink or white with pink at the base of the lobes and bloom from September to November in their native range. S. marradongense is only known from south-western Western Australia from Mount Saddleback to Marradong. Its habitat is recorded as being sandy laterite soils in open jarrah forest with other species such as Banksia grandis, Banksia sessilis, and Persoonia longifolia. S. marradongense is closely associated with S. preissii because they both lack throat appendages. It differs from S. preissii by its spike-like racemes, apical mucro, and conical, capitate stigmas.

== See also ==
- List of Stylidium species
