= Stylidium leeuwinense =

Conservation status
- Priority Three — Poorly Known Taxa (DEC)

Scientific classification
- Kingdom: Plantae
- Clade: Tracheophytes
- Clade: Angiosperms
- Clade: Eudicots
- Clade: Asterids
- Order: Asterales
- Family: Stylidiaceae
- Genus: Stylidium
- Subgenus: Stylidium subg. Forsteropsis
- Species: S. leeuwinense

Binomial name
- Stylidium leeuwinense Lowrie & Kenneally 1997

Species of carnivorous plant

Stylidium leeuwinense is a species that belongs to the genus Stylidium (family Stylidiaceae). The specific epithet leeuwinense refers to the Cape Leeuwin region in Western Australia where the type location for this species is. It is an herbaceous perennial that grows from 15 to 60 cm tall and has divided stems covered with tile-like leaves that are arranged in a spiral formation around the stem. The lanceolate leaves are basifixed and held closely against the stems. The leaves are around 2.5-3.5 mm long and 0.5-0.8 mm wide. Terminal inflorescences are racemose or spike-like and produce flowers that are reddish purple with laterally-paired lobes and bloom from February to May in their native range. S. leeuwinense is only known from south-western Western Australia along the coast from Augusta to Denmark. Its habitat is recorded as being black, peat-sand soils in swampy areas or heathland. S. leeuwinense, along with S. preissii, is distinct within its subgenus because it possesses leaves without an apical mucro (sharp point). It differs from S. preissii by its spike-like racemes.

== See also ==
- List of Stylidium species
