= Phyllachne colensoi =

- Phyllachne colensoi illustration from Johannes Mildbraed's 1908 monograph on the Stylidiaceae.

Scientific classification
- Kingdom: Plantae
- Clade: Tracheophytes
- Clade: Angiosperms
- Clade: Eudicots
- Clade: Asterids
- Order: Asterales
- Family: Stylidiaceae
- Genus: Phyllachne
- Species: P. colensoi

Binomial name
- Phyllachne colensoi (Hook.f.) Berggr.

Synonyms
- Helophyllum colensoi Hook.f.

Species of flowering plant

Phyllachne colensoi, the yellow cushionplant, is a species of cushion plant in the Stylidiaceae family. It is native to both New Zealand and Tasmania, with colonisation of the latter being a somewhat recent dispersal. Phyllachne colensoi is frequently the dominant vegetation in upland bog habitats and is found throughout high mountain areas in New Zealand, but is only recorded from 12 sites in Tasmania in the west and south-west of the island.

Phyllachne colensoi is a perennial cushion mound-forming plant with short erect stems that are densely packed. Leaves are sessile and small at only 2–3 mm long. Solitary flowers are white and held close to the cushion mound, with flowers and fruits being produced from December to March.

Phyllachne colensoi was first described as Helophyllum colensoi by Joseph Dalton Hooker in 1864 and then moved to the genus Phyllachne by Sven Berggren in 1877.
