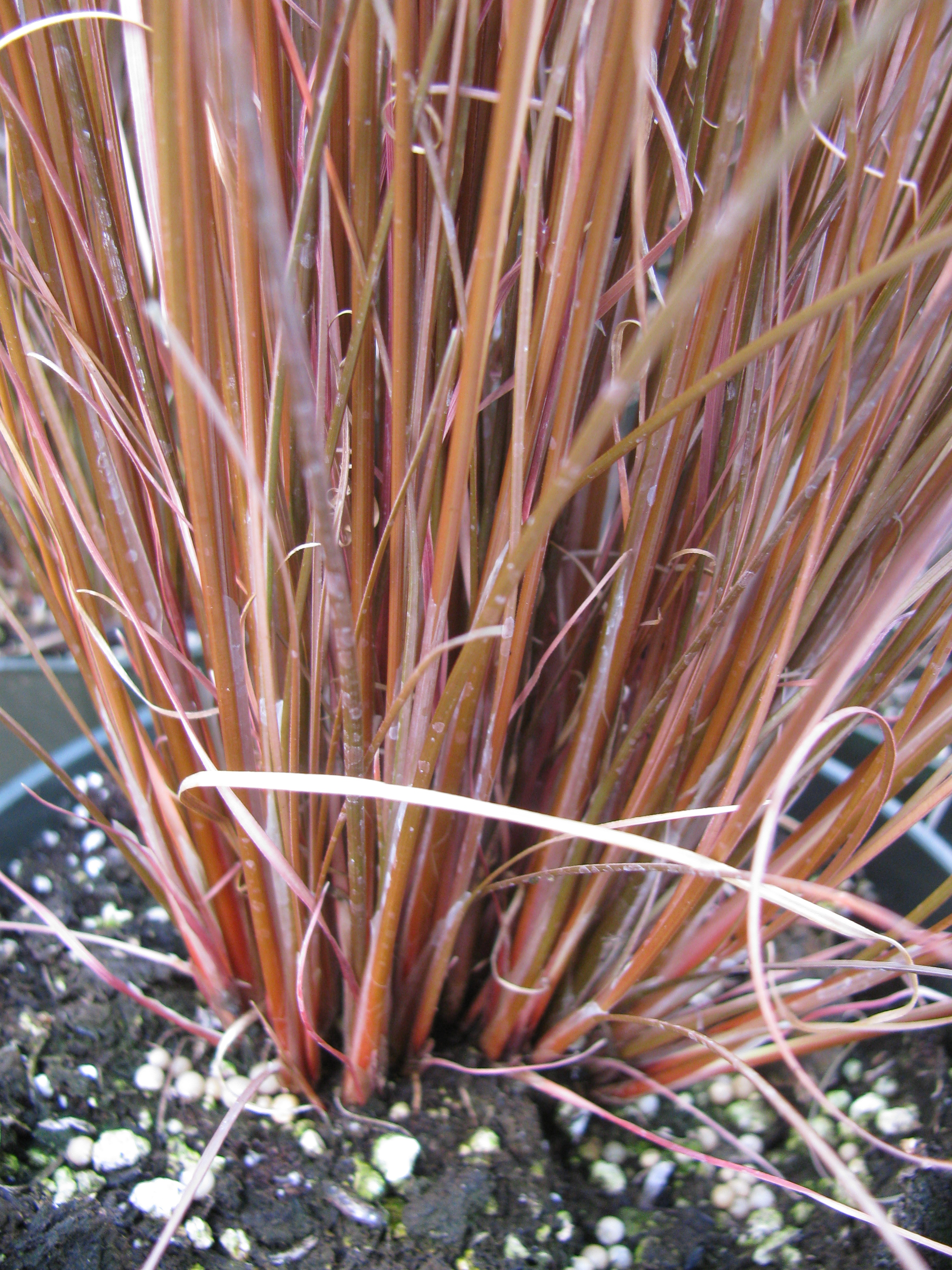

Conservation status
- Declining (NZ TCS)

Scientific classification
- Kingdom: Plantae
- Clade: Embryophytes
- Clade: Tracheophytes
- Clade: Spermatophytes
- Clade: Angiosperms
- Clade: Monocots
- Clade: Commelinids
- Order: Poales
- Family: Cyperaceae
- Genus: Carex
- Species: C. buchananii

Binomial name
- Carex buchananii Berggr.
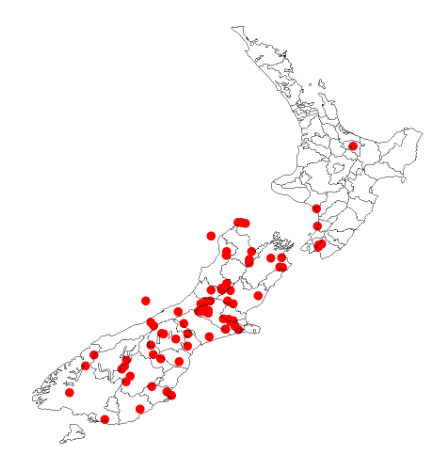
- Occurrence data from AVH

Synonyms
- Carex tenax Berggr. Carex lucida Boott var. buchanani (Berggr.) Kük

= Carex buchananii =

Species of grass-like plant

Carex buchananii, common names Buchanan's sedge, cutty grass, is a species of sedge (in the Cyperaceae family). It is endemic to New Zealand, being found on both the North and South Islands.

It has no synonyms according to Plants of the world online, but two according to the New Zealand Plant Conservation Network

== Description ==
It is a reddish-brown, densely tufted sedge.

It flowers from October to December and fruits from November to June and the nuts are dispersed by granivory and wind.

== Distribution and habitat ==
It is uncommon in the North Island, being found south of the Manawatu. In the South Island it is found more widely but has not been found in Westland and Fiordland. It is found from the coast to the mountains (to an altitude of 1000 m) growing on beaches and lake and stream margins.

== Conservation status ==
Assessments under the New Zealand Threat Classification System (NZTCS), declared it to be "Not Threatened" in 2013, but in 2017 to be "At Risk - Declining" (Dec).

In the UK it is naturalised and considered an invasive species.

== Taxonomy and naming ==
It was first described in 1880 by Sven Berggren, who gave it the specific epithet, Buchanani (now buchananii), to honour the New Zealand botanist, John Buchanan (1819–1898).
