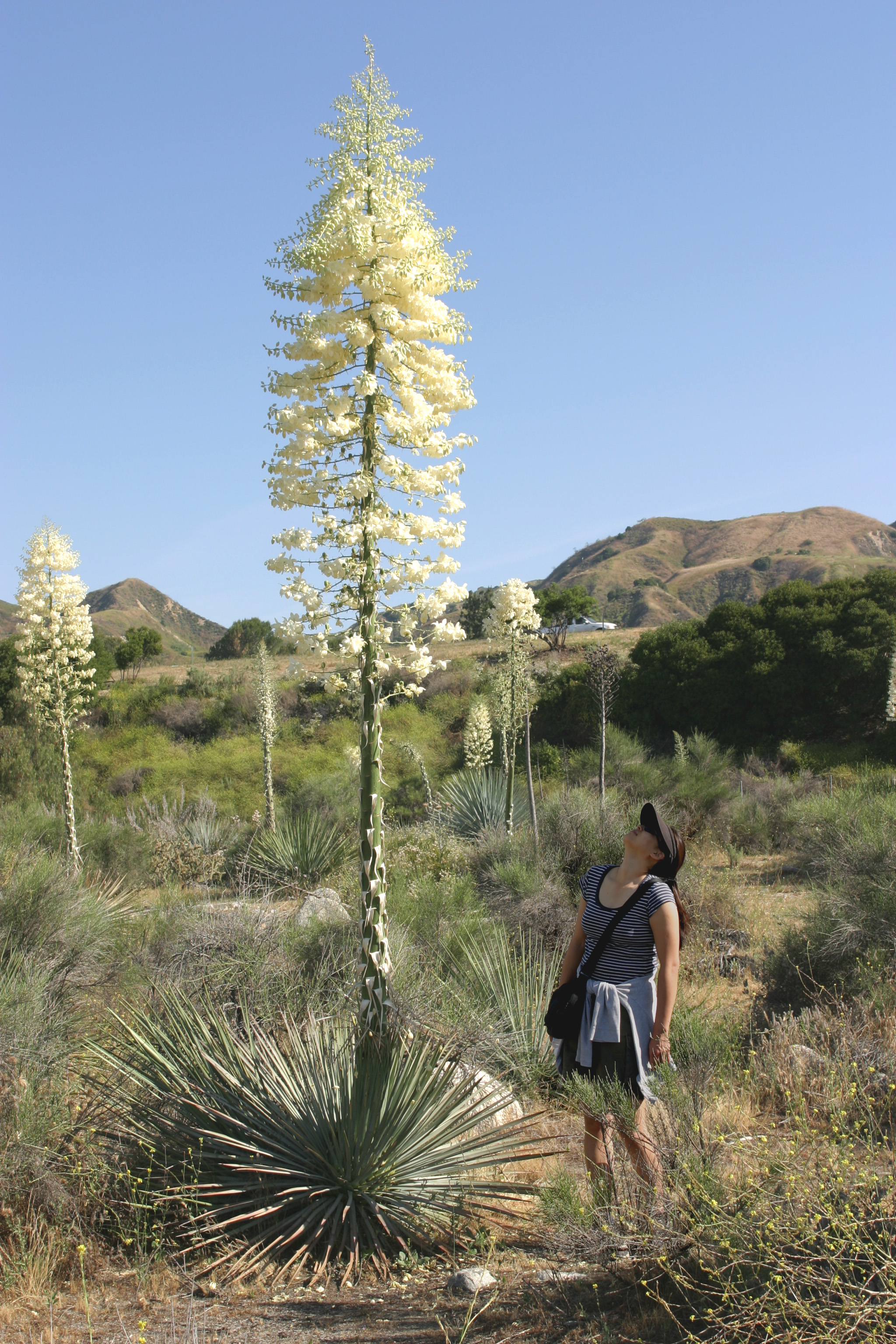

Scientific classification
- Kingdom: Plantae
- Clade: Embryophytes
- Clade: Tracheophytes
- Clade: Spermatophytes
- Clade: Angiosperms
- Clade: Monocots
- Order: Asparagales
- Family: Asparagaceae
- Subfamily: Agavoideae
- Genus: Hesperoyucca
- Species: H. whipplei

Binomial name
- Hesperoyucca whipplei (Torr.) Trel.

Synonyms
- Yucca engelmannii Mast.; Yucca graminifolia Alph. Wood; Yucca nitida C.Wright ex. W.Watson; Yucca whipplei Torr.

= Hesperoyucca whipplei =

Chaparral yucca

Species of flowering plant

Hesperoyucca whipplei (syn. Yucca whipplei), the chaparral yucca, our Lord's candle, Spanish bayonet, Quixote yucca or foothill yucca, is a species of flowering plant closely related to, and formerly usually included in, the genus Yucca. It is native to southwest communities of North America.

== Description ==
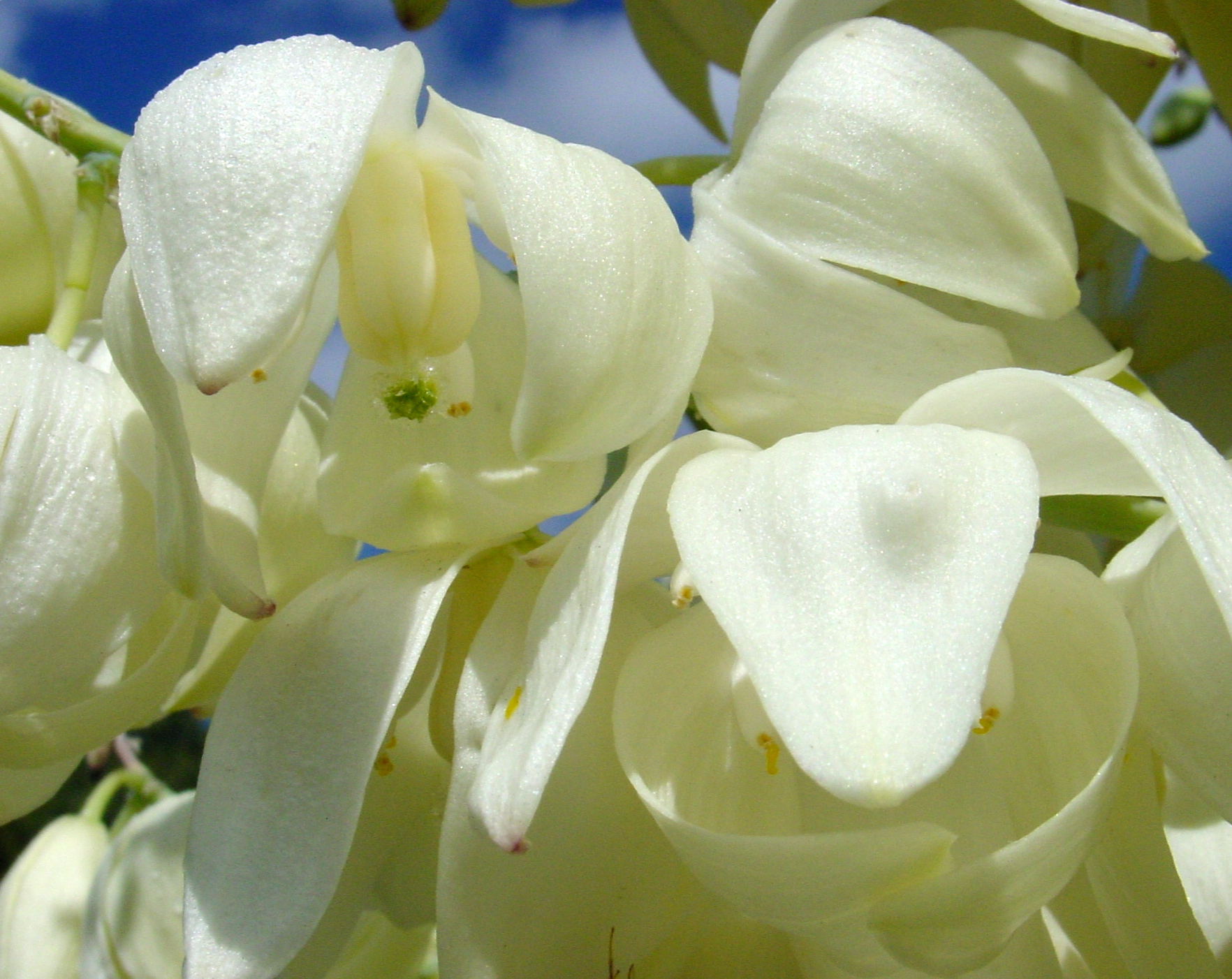
Several flowers, hundreds of which comprise the inflorescence

It produces a stemless basal rosette cluster of long, rigid leaves which end in a sharp point. The leaves are 20–90 cm (8–35 in), rarely to 125 cm (49 in), long and 0.7–2 cm (1/4–3/4 in) wide, and gray-green in color. The leaf edges are finely saw-toothed.

The single inflorescence grows extremely fast, and reaches 0.9–3 metres (3–10 ft) tall, bearing hundreds of elliptical (bell-shaped) white to purplish flowers 3 cm (1 1/4 in) in diameter on a densely branched panicle up to 70 cm (28 in) broad, covering the upper half of the inflorescence. The flowers are fragrant. The fruit is a dry winged capsule, which splits open at maturity to release the seeds. According to Guinness the inflorescence pedicel of H. whipplei can grow up to 25 cm (9.8 in) a day towards an eventual height of 3.65 m (12.0 ft).

The plant takes several (usually 5+) years to reach maturity and flower, doing so in April–May, at which point it usually dies. Most subspecies produce offshoots from the base, so that although the parent plant flowers and dies, a cluster of clones around its base continue to grow and reproduce. It may also grow back from its base after much of its foliage has been scorched off by the wildfires that are frequent in its range.

== Taxonomy ==
The taxonomy of H. whipplei is complex and controversial. Hesperoyucca was described as a genus by George Engelmann as long ago as 1892, but it has taken recent DNA analysis to confirm that they are genetically distinct from Yucca.

Among those botanists who have treated (or still treat) it as a species of Yucca, six subspecies have been recognised; others have regarded them as varieties.

Hochstätter's subspecies are:

- Yucca whipplei ssp. whipplei
- Yucca whipplei ssp. caespitosa
- Yucca whipplei ssp. intermedia
- Yucca whipplei ssp. percursa
- Yucca whipplei ssp. newberryi
- Yucca whipplei ssp. eremica

The plant treated as the subspecies Y. whipplei subsp. newberryi has been shown to be genetically distinct, and is often treated as a distinct species, Hesperoyucca newberryi. It is native further east, in Arizona, and differs in the capsules being unwinged or with only slight wings.

=== Etymology ===
- "Yuca" is a native name for the unrelated Manihot, a genus in the spurge family.
- Yucca whipplei is named after Amiel Weeks Whipple (1818–1863), a surveyor who oversaw the Pacific Railroad Survey to Los Angeles in 1853.
- The name our Lord's candle is derived from its huge, flame-shaped inflorescence.
- Spanish bayonet refers to the needle-sharp leaf tips which can cause discomfort to the unwary passer-by.

== Distribution ==
It is native to southern California in the United States and Baja California in Mexico, where it occurs mainly in chaparral, coastal sage scrub, and oak woodland plant communities at altitudes of 0–2,500 metres (8,200 feet). Yucca whipplei grows on the rocky slopes and washes of the chaparral area of the transverse mountains of Southern California up to approximately 1,200 m (4,000 ft) above mean sea level.

This is the only species of the asparagus family naturally present in the Santa Monica Mountains of the transverse ranges.

== Ecology ==
It blooms beginning in April through July, blooming abundantly in chaparral and oak woodland up to 2,500 feet (760 metres). The shoots that bear flowers die after flowering, but produce offsets around the old roots.

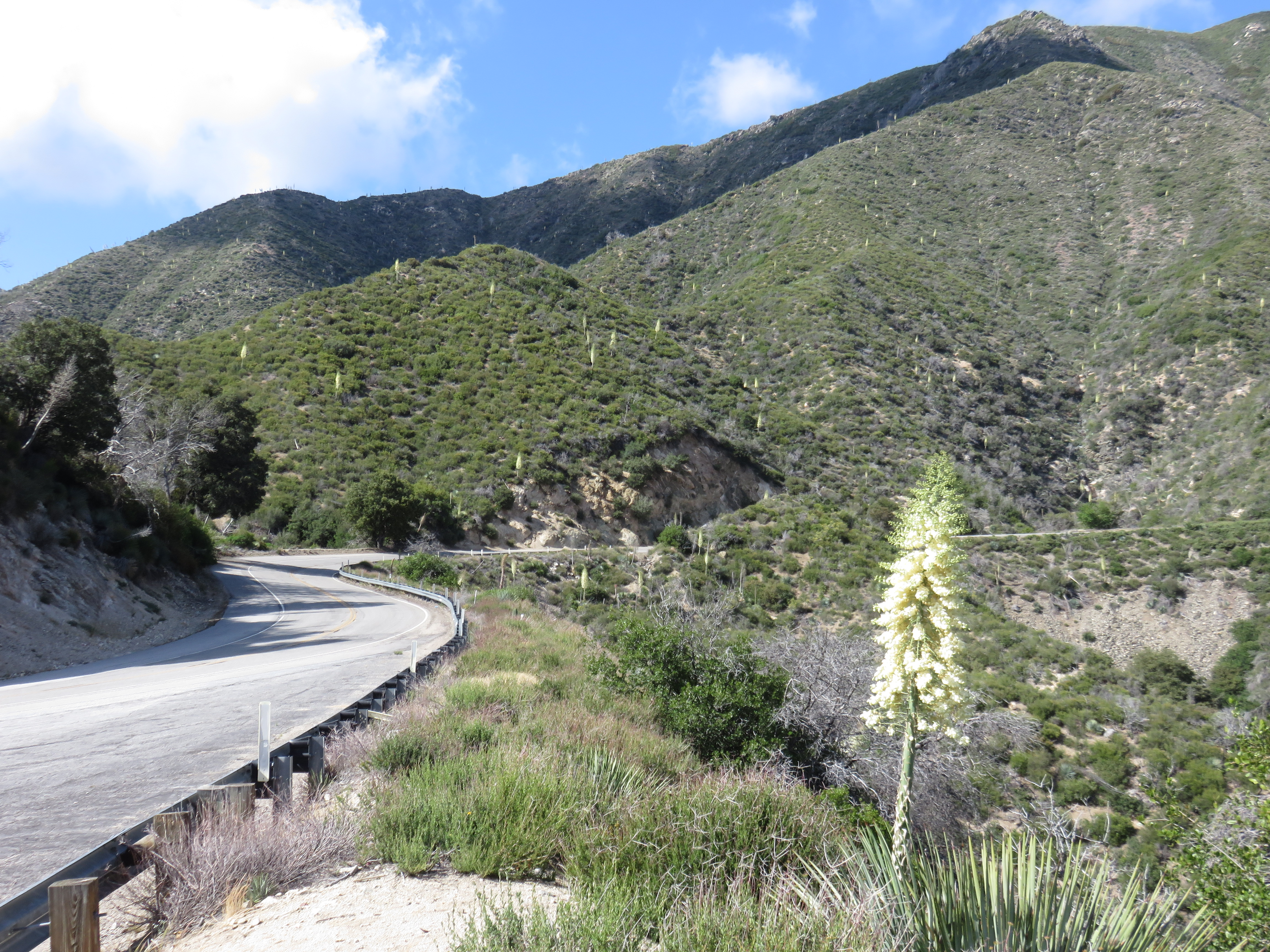
Several plants in flower in the San Gabriel Mountains

It is pollinated by the California yucca moth (Tegeticula maculata), a relationship which has become a classic example of mutualism. The female yucca moth collects up to a dozen sacks of pollen grains called pollinia and forms them into a massive ball. The moth then flies to another plant and lands on the ovary of a flower. Standing with its head near the stigma, the moth inserts its ovipositor into the ovary wall and lays a single egg. The moth then rubs its pollen mass against the central stigmatic depression, ensuring pollination. The pollinated ovary will now produce many seeds, ensuring an ample food supply for the larva. Although many associations of Yucca and yucca moth exist, Tegeticula maculata and Hesperoyucca whipplei form an exclusive relationship.

== Uses ==
Hesperoyucca whipplei is used in xeriscaping in Southern California, but reportedly is difficult to grow outside of its native range (although it is widely available from specialist nurseries in the United Kingdom). It is extremely drought tolerant and thrives in clay soils.

It has been used extensively by Native Americans. Yucca species such as Y. whipplei have been documented to have been used as a fiber and food source by Native Americans in the Southwest cultural region, prior to European settlement. Archaeological evidence shows that use of yucca species extends to approximately 5,000 years ago within groups such as the Serrano of the San Bernardino Mountains and San Gabriel Mountains of the transverse mountain ranges of Southern California, where the species grows on rocky slopes and washes in chaparrals. The seeds would be ground into flour. The Serrano harvested the hearts of the plant during the spring growing season. Harvested plants were chosen based on the growth of the stalk; the hearts were the preferred portion of the plant, and would be harvested before the stalk was fully developed. The heart contains the sugars stored to rapidly grow a stalk to flower, and become bitter as the stalk grows in height. The hearts would then be roasted in stone lined pits (earth oven) over several hours in a manner similar to that of agave species. Once cooked, the hearts would be removed and allowed to cool before eating. Uneaten portions could be dried for storage. Though slightly bitter, the stalk and flowers can be harvested and used as food sources as well. The stalks can be prepared roasted in a manner similar to the hearts, while the petals were often parboiled.

The long leaves of species such as the Y. whipplei are made of strong fibers which can be pounded and scraped to expose long threads which run the length of the leaf. The leaves could be processed in many ways to remove the outer layer of leaf material which could be processed into threads and cords, used for basketry, blankets, and sandals. Green leaves can be heated over coals or directly on flames to heat the leaves. Cooking the leaves removes some of the saponins and allows for easier scraping. Ethnographic accounts dating to 1938 describes the preparation of leaves for fibers as any one of the following: boiling or pit roasting of live leaves to be scraped clean or the pounding or soaking of dry leaves expose fibers. Shells or stone scrapers were often employed to remove outer leaf material from the fibers. Once exposed, these fibers were often soaked in water to soften fiber. The fibers could then be twisted into cordage, used as materials in a basket, woven into sandals, and for making nets.

Other groups made use of different varieties of yucca species found throughout the American Southwest. Archaeological evidence shows use of Yucca shidigera (Mojave yucca) near the area of the Mexico–United States border dating as early as 5,000 years ago. Residues of yucca were found on some stone tools in a cave site in Texas indicate that yucca was used to secure stone tools to other materials. Ethnographic evidence of the Mogollon has shown the use of the leaves with green leaf matter intact and woven into sandals. The green leaves are fire heated and no scraping or further processing occurs to remove fibers, though the spine is removed from the tip. The whole green leaves are then tightly woven to shape the bed of the sandal, and secured to the foot with cordage ties.

== Gallery ==
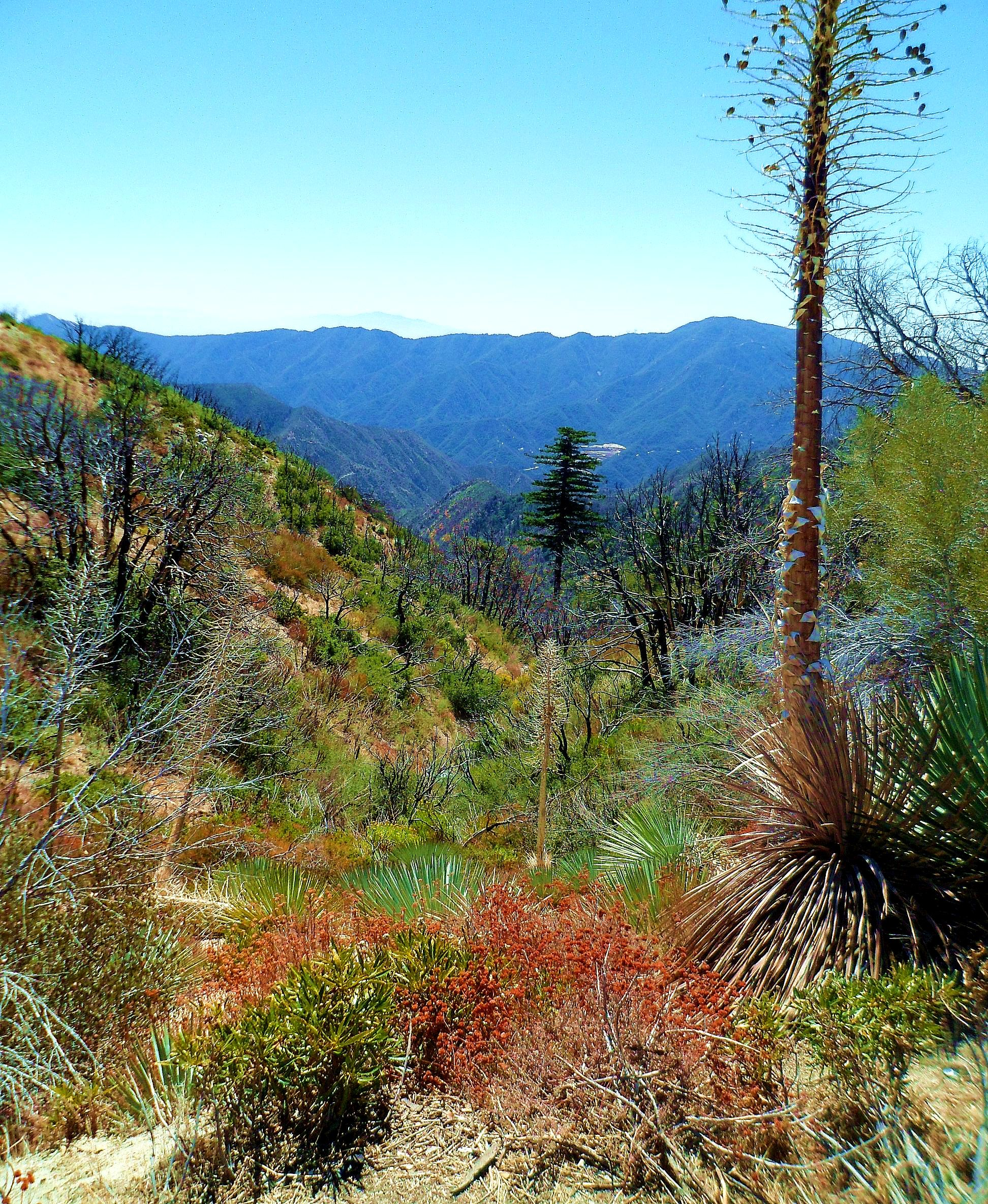
In Angeles National Forest

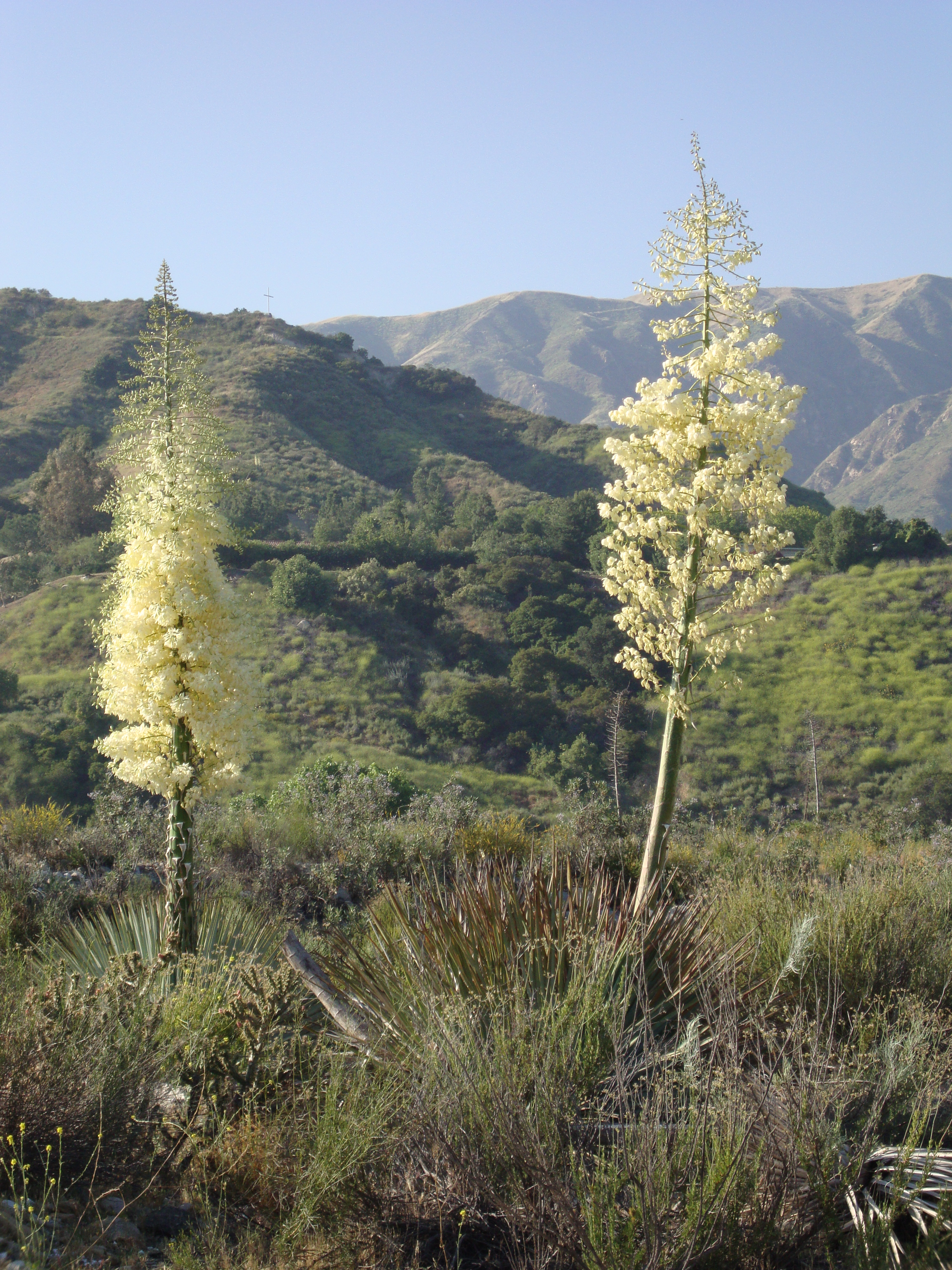
In full bloom

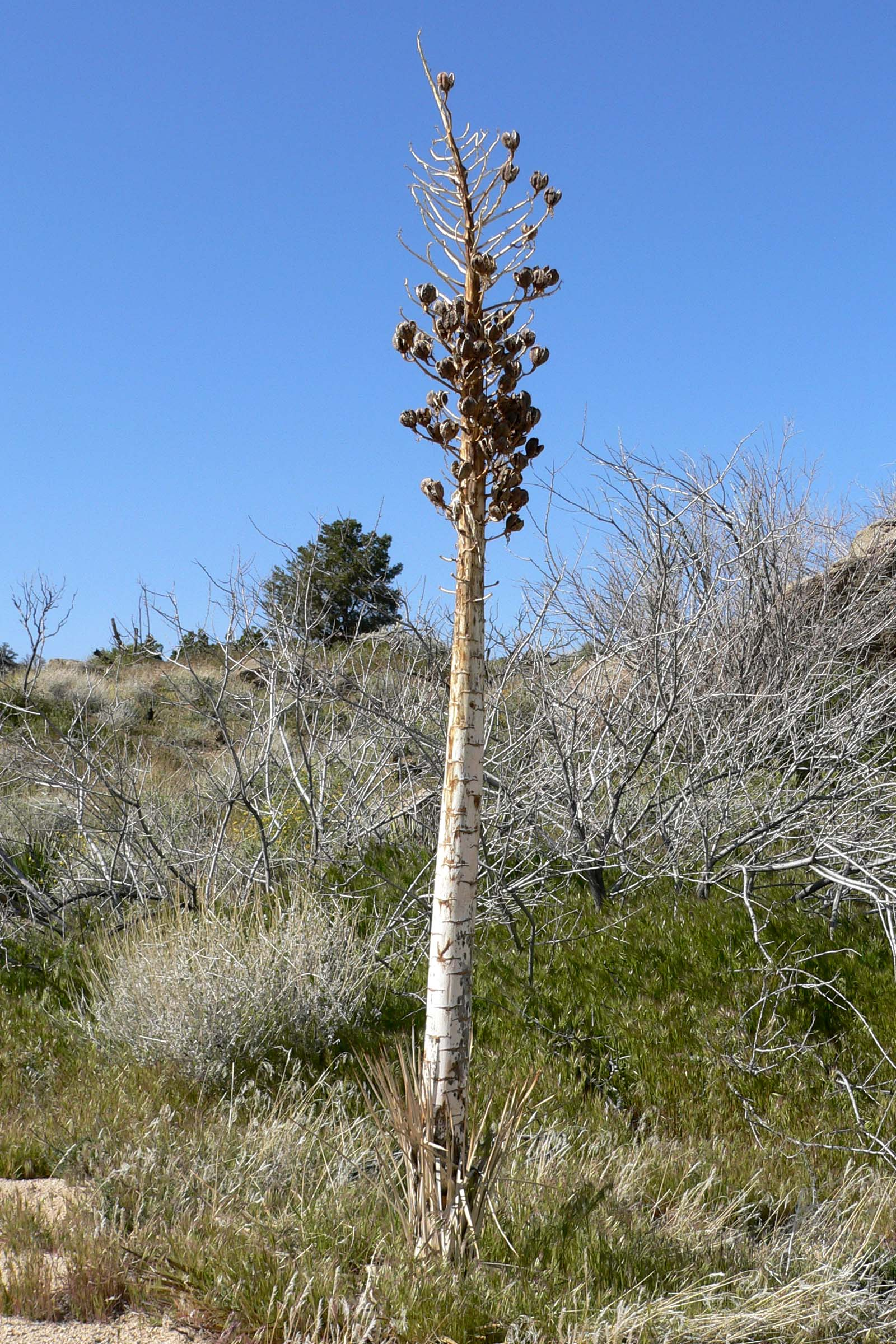
Dried flower stalk with seedpods

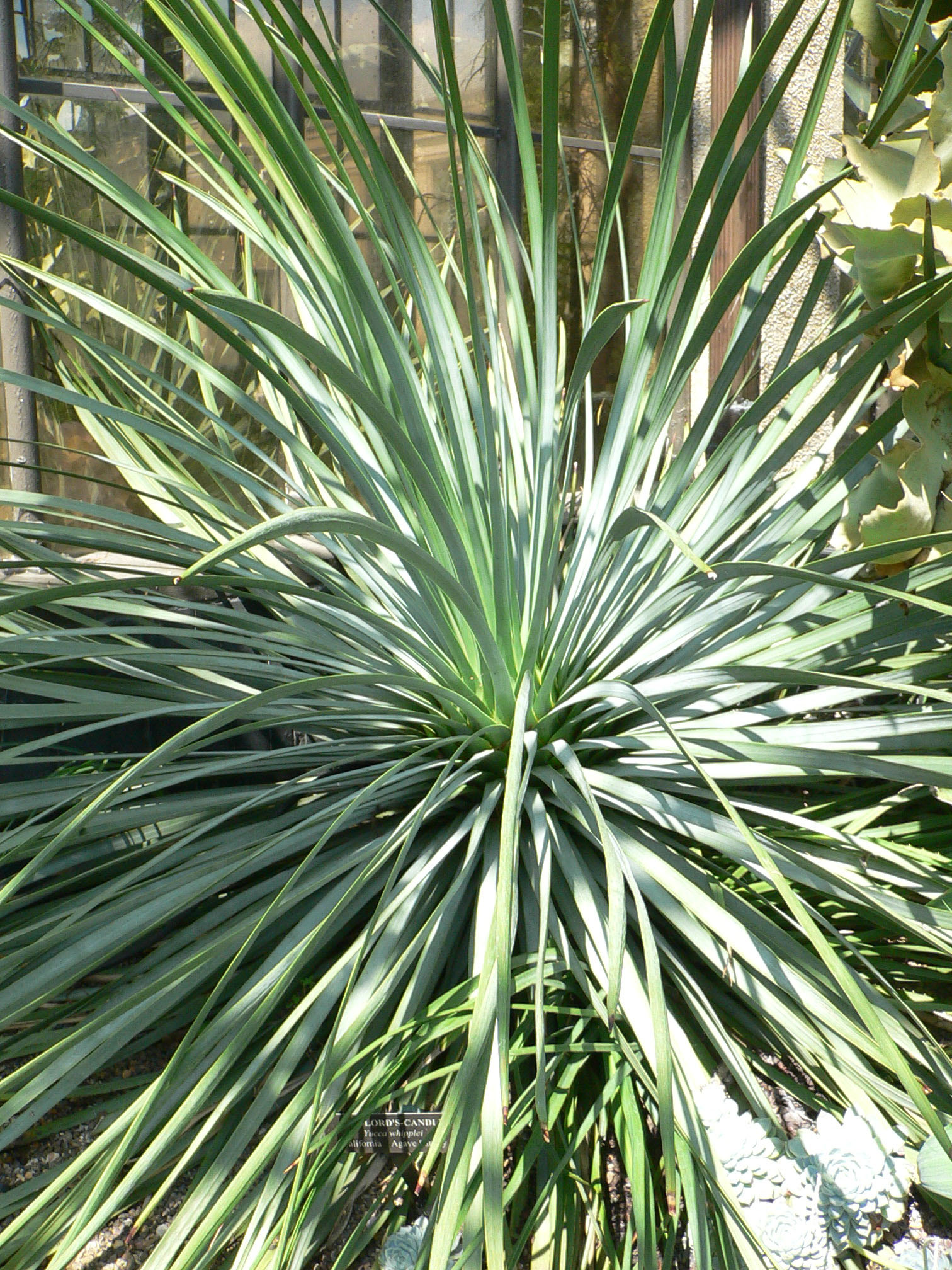
Foliage rosette

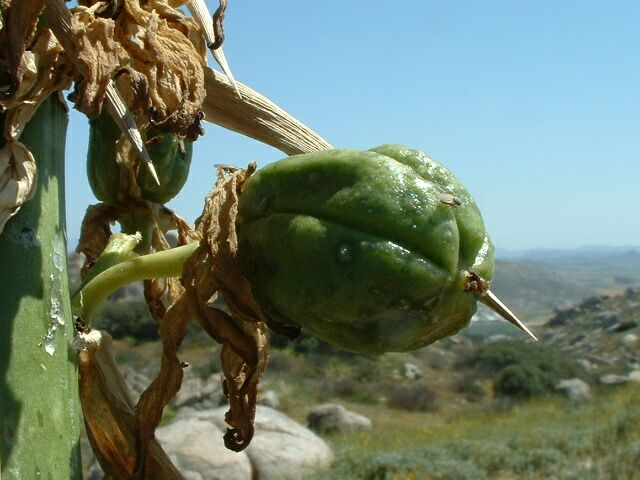
Fruit

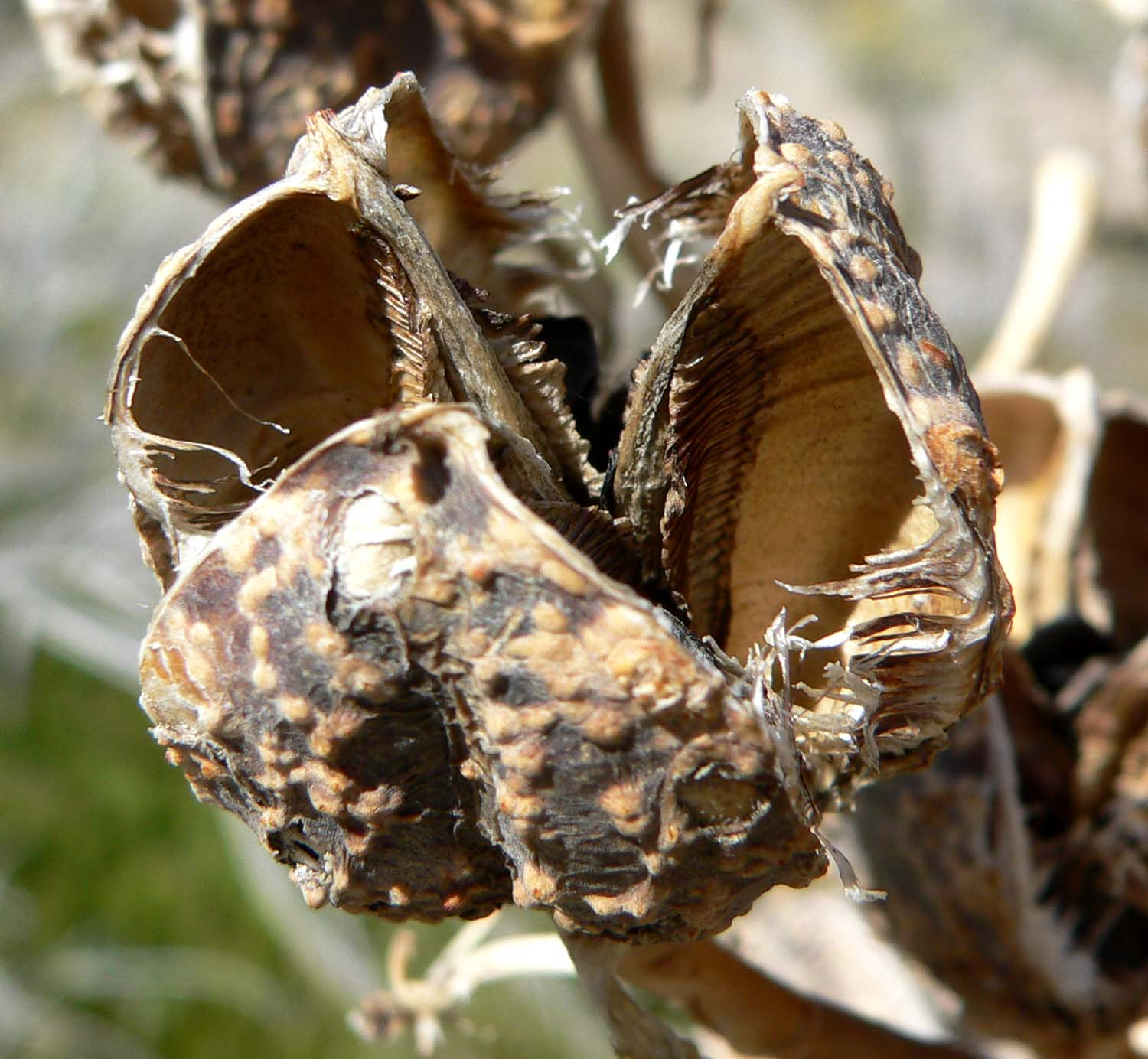
Dried and opened seedpod
