= List of plants with indehiscent fruits =

Indehiscent fruit do not open at maturity in a pre-defined way, but rely on predation or decomposition to release the seeds.

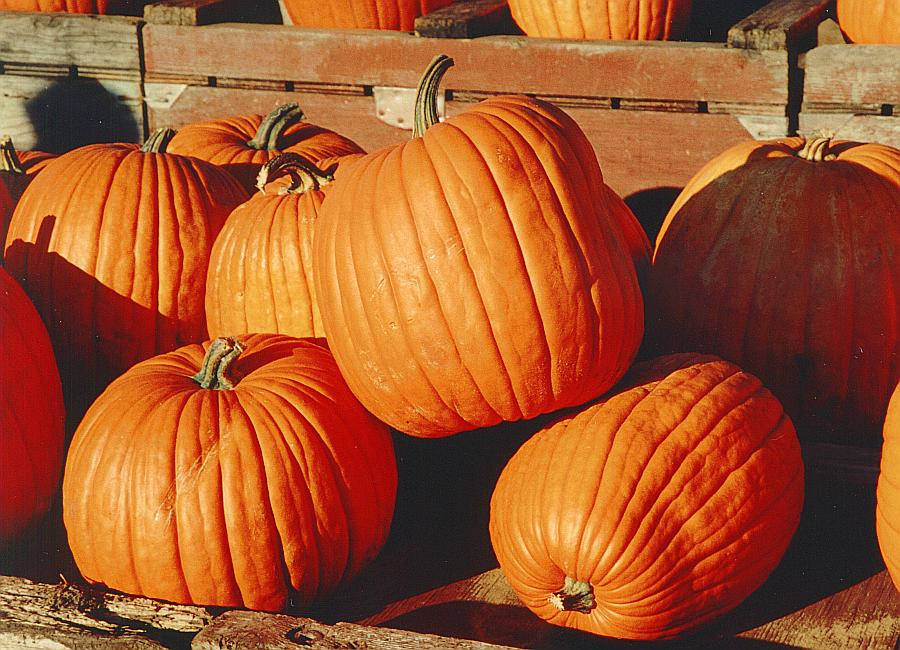
Pumpkin seeds are not released until the fruit is eaten or decays

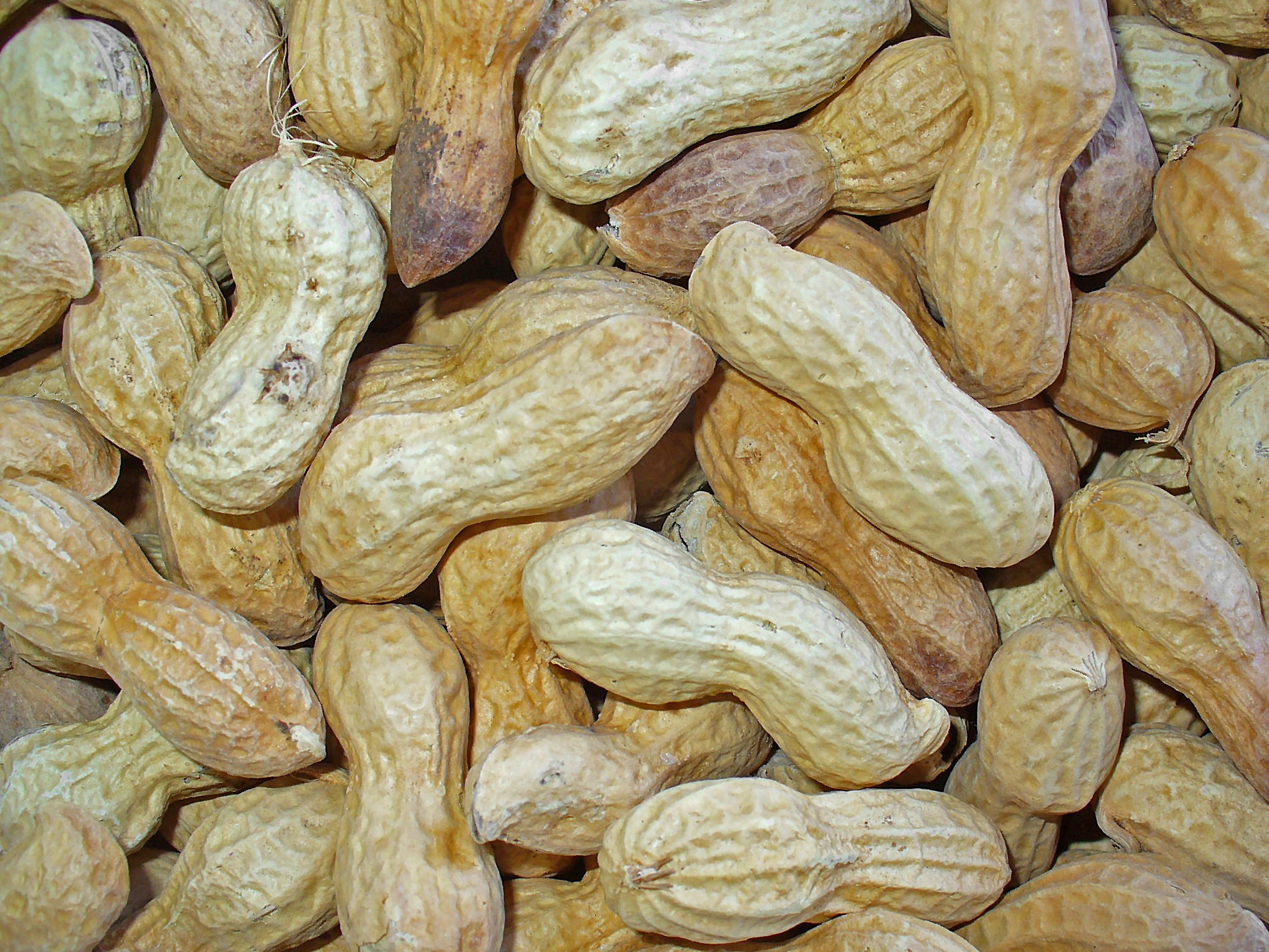
Peanut seeds are contained in indehiscent legume fruit

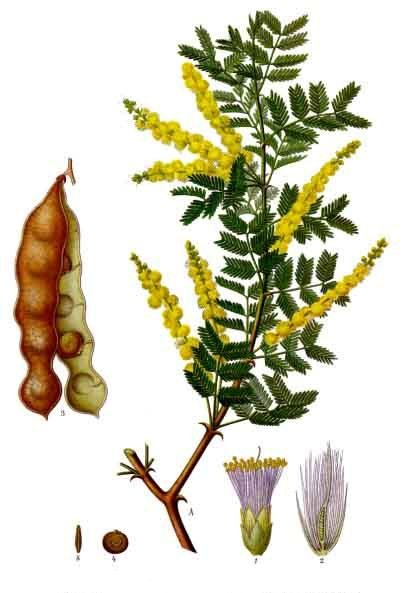
Acacia senegal fruits, in contrast, are dehiscent legume fruit

Some, but not all, indehiscent fruits are included in specialized morphological categories such as achene, berry, caryopsis, cypsela, drupe, hesperidium, loment, pepo, pome, samara, syconium.

See also: List of plants with dehiscent fruits

- Asparagus
- Clematis
- Cyrtosia
- Desmodium
- Donatia
- Filipendula
- Malinae
- Malus
- Maple
- Oreostylidium
- Palmorchis
- Peanut
- Phyllachne
- Punica
- Raphanus
- Rhizanthella
- Tamarind
