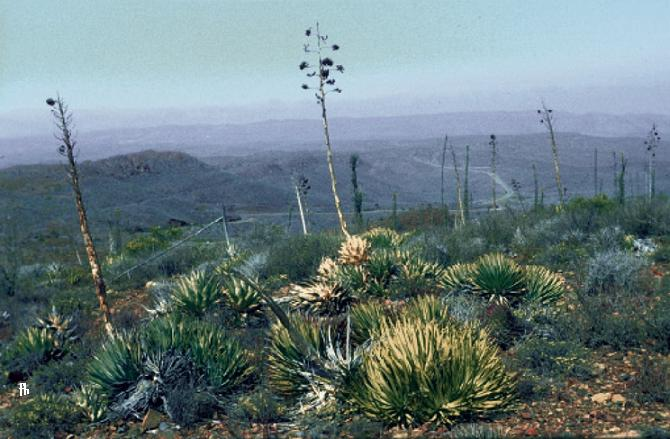

Conservation status
- Least Concern (IUCN 3.1)

Scientific classification
- Kingdom: Plantae
- Clade: Embryophytes
- Clade: Tracheophytes
- Clade: Spermatophytes
- Clade: Angiosperms
- Clade: Monocots
- Order: Asparagales
- Family: Asparagaceae
- Subfamily: Agavoideae
- Genus: Hesperoyucca
- Species: H. peninsularis

Binomial name
- Hesperoyucca peninsularis (McKelvey) Clary

Synonyms
- Yucca peninsularis McKelvey; Yucca whipplei subsp. eremica Epling & A.L.Haines

= Hesperoyucca peninsularis =

Species of flowering plant

Hesperoyucca peninsularis, the peninsular candle or lechuguilla, is a plant species endemic to the Baja California peninsula. It is a perennial forming a rosette. It is semelparous (flowering once then dying).

== Description ==
Plants are monocarpic or polycarpic, and sometimes rhizomatous. Some form secondary rosettes at their base while others branch their caudex to produce new rosettes after flowering.

== Taxonomy ==
=== Phylogeny and classification ===
Although morphological characteristics and phylogenetic ITS analysis show that H. peninsularis is somewhat distinct from H. whipplei, it is still widely recognized as either a form or a subspecies of H. whipplei. More conclusive research shows that H. peninsularis and H. whipplei form a polytomy, and are sister to H. newberryi, which is consistent with the fact that the populations of H. newberryi are disjunct from the genus while H. peninsularis and H. whipplei overlap.

== Distribution and habitat ==
It occurs in the coastal succulent scrub of northwestern Baja California south into the central desert and the Sierra de San Francisco in Baja California Sur.

This species grows in association with elephant cactus, Larrea, Boojum trees, barrel cacti, Dudleya, Agave, ragweed and chollas. It grows on granite or basalt soils. The plant tends to grow in clusters but occasionally can be found growing solitarily.
