= Neoregelia ibitipocensis =

Scientific classification
- Kingdom: Plantae
- Clade: Tracheophytes
- Clade: Angiosperms
- Clade: Monocots
- Clade: Commelinids
- Order: Poales
- Family: Bromeliaceae
- Genus: Neoregelia
- Subgenus: Neoregelia subg. Longipetalopsis
- Species: N. ibitipocensis

Binomial name
- Neoregelia ibitipocensis (Leme) Leme

Species of flowering plant

Neoregelia ibitipocensis is a species of flowering plant in the genus Neoregelia. This species is a rare endemic species found exclusively in several cloud dwarf forests within Ibitipoca State Park, located in southeastern Brazil. It is classified as endangered in the state of Minas Gerais. Neoregelia ibitipocensis possesses fleshy, indehiscent fruits, and belongs within the nidularioid complex. It can be distinguished by its inflorescences, which have a short peduncle and are situated in the water tank created by the rosette leaves. The only insect documented to pollinate and visit the plant is the bumblebee.
