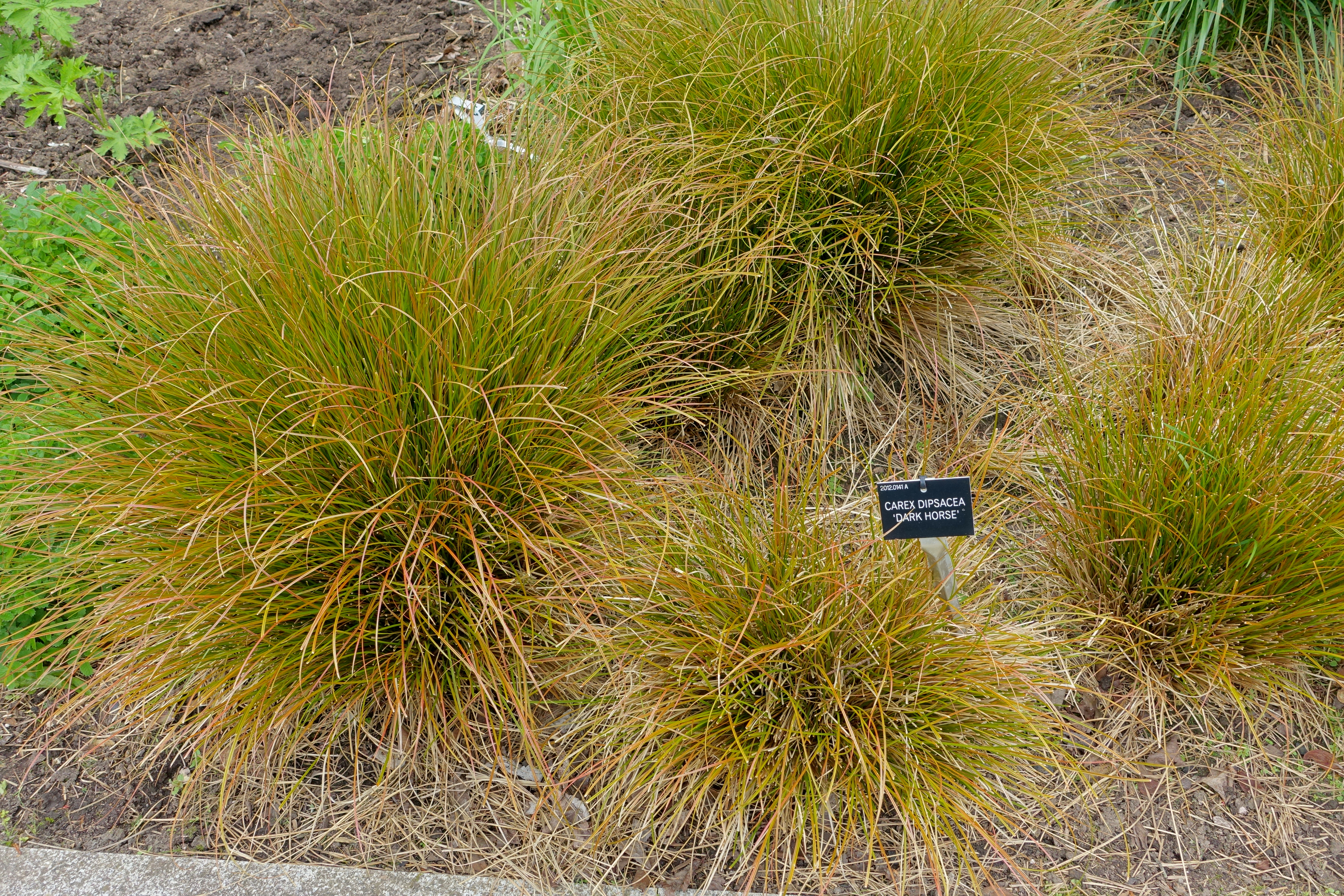
- 'Dark Horse' cultivar at the Sir Harold Hillier Gardens

Scientific classification
- Kingdom: Plantae
- Clade: Tracheophytes
- Clade: Angiosperms
- Clade: Monocots
- Clade: Commelinids
- Order: Poales
- Family: Cyperaceae
- Genus: Carex
- Species: C. dipsacea

Binomial name
- Carex dipsacea Berggr.

Synonyms
- Carex tahoata Hamlin

= Carex dipsacea =

Species of grass-like plant

Carex dipsacea, the teasel sedge, is a species of flowering plant in the family Cyperaceae, native to New Zealand. Preferring poorly drained soils, it is planted as an ornamental for its colorful autumn foliage. There is a cultivar, 'Dark Horse', which is commercially available.
