= Neoregelia kerryi =

Scientific classification
- Kingdom: Plantae
- Clade: Embryophytes
- Clade: Tracheophytes
- Clade: Spermatophytes
- Clade: Angiosperms
- Clade: Monocots
- Clade: Commelinids
- Order: Poales
- Family: Bromeliaceae
- Genus: Neoregelia
- Subgenus: Neoregelia subg. Longipetalopsis
- Species: N. kerryi

Binomial name
- Neoregelia kerryi Leme

Species of flowering plant

Neoregelia kerryi is a species of flowering plant in the genus Neoregelia. It is endemic to Brazil. Its name has also been incorrectly spelt Neoregelia kerryae.

== Taxonomy ==
Neoregelia kerryi was first described by Elton Leme in 1998. The specific epithet kerryi was given as a tribute to Kerry Herndon, former president of a bromeliad nursery in Florida. As Kerry Herndon is a man, the epithet kerryi is correct; kerryae would be for a woman.
