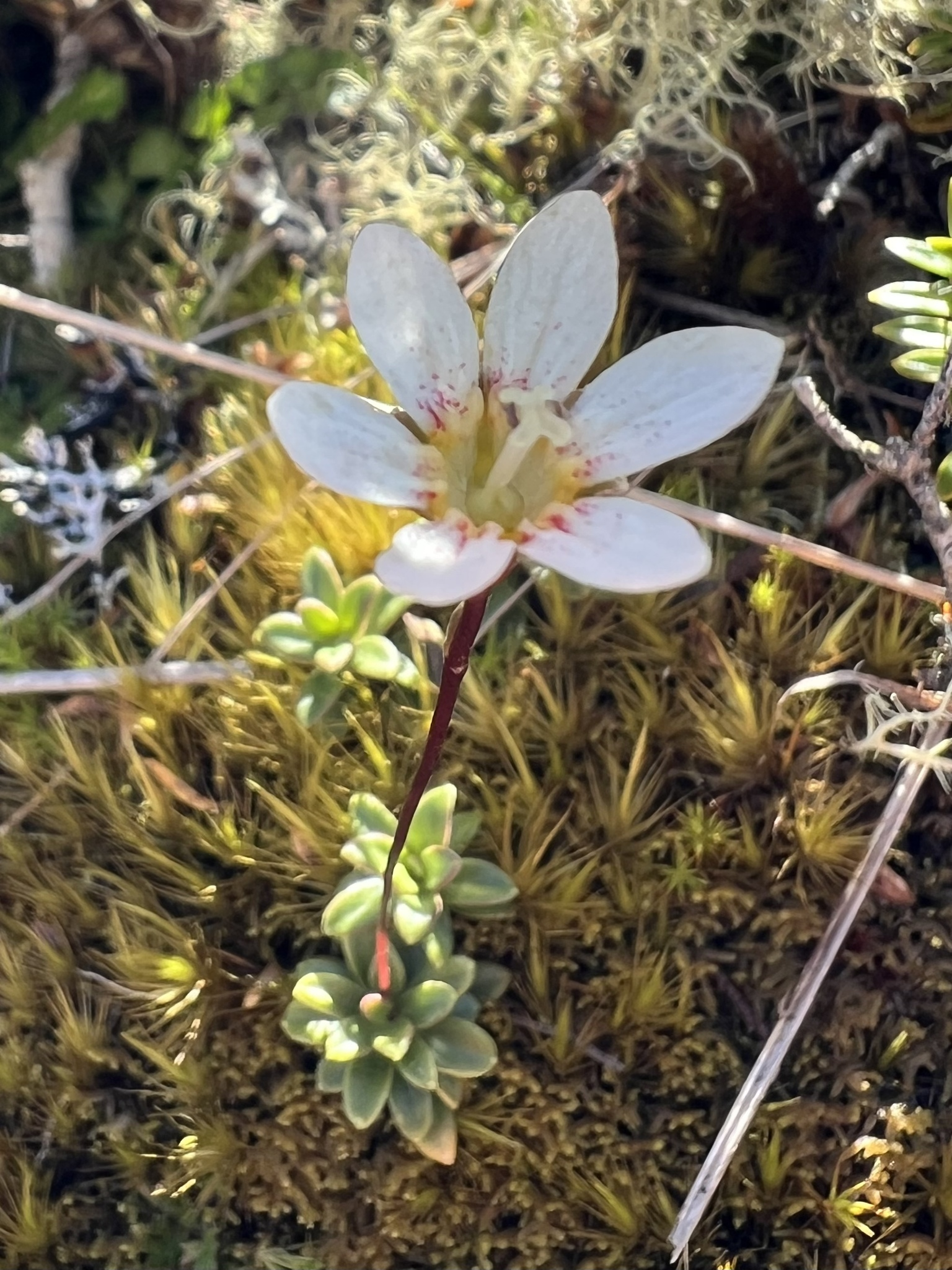
- Forstera tenella in Tongariro National Park

Conservation status
- Not Threatened (NZ TCS)

Scientific classification
- Kingdom: Plantae
- Clade: Tracheophytes
- Clade: Angiosperms
- Clade: Eudicots
- Clade: Asterids
- Order: Asterales
- Family: Stylidiaceae
- Genus: Forstera
- Species: F. tenella

Binomial name
- Forstera tenella Hook.f.

= Forstera tenella =

Species of flowering plant

Forstera tenella is a species of flowering plant, endemic to New Zealand.

== Description ==
A small flower with white petals, long stalk, and green leaves arranged in a rosette pattern.

== Distribution and habitat ==
This plant is known from both the North and South Island of New Zealand.

== Etymology ==
Tenella means 'delicate' in Latin.
