= Forstera =

- Forstera bidwillii illustration from Johannes Mildbraed's 1908 monograph on the Stylidiaceae.

Scientific classification
- Kingdom: Plantae
- Clade: Tracheophytes
- Clade: Angiosperms
- Clade: Eudicots
- Clade: Asterids
- Order: Asterales
- Family: Stylidiaceae
- Subfamily: Stylidioideae
- Genus: Forstera; L. ex G.Forst.

Type species
- Forstera sedifolia G.Forst.

Species
- Forstera bellidifolia; Forstera bidwillii; Forstera mackayii; Forstera sedifolia; Forstera tenella

Genus of flowering plants

Forstera is a genus of small perennial plants in the Stylidiaceae family named in honour of the German naturalists Johann Reinhold Forster and his son, Georg Forster, who had previously described Forstera's sister genus, Phyllachne just five years earlier. It comprises five species that are endemic to New Zealand with the exception of F. bellidifolia, which is endemic to Tasmania. The species in this genus resemble those in a subgenus of the related genus Stylidium called Forsteropsis, but they are more closely related to the genus Phyllachne. Proposals to merge the two genera based on information from cladistic analysis have emerged because of these genera's morphological similarities and evidence that they are paraphyletic.

== Description ==
The species in Forstera are generally erect or decumbent perennials with small imbricate leaves and pedicellate, actinomorphic flowers.

Forstera and its closely allied sister genus Phyllachne have often been regarded as the most plesiomorphic genera in their family. Characteristics that this genus shares with Phyllachne include apically fused thecae that form a single-celled curved anther and the epigynous nectaries. Forstera can be distinguished from Phyllachne by its long peduncle (absent in Phyllachne) and the cushion plant habit of Phyllachne.

== Botanical history ==
The genus Forstera was first named by Carl Linnaeus and described in 1780 by Georg Forster in Nova Acta Regiae Societatis Scientiarum Upsaliensis. Many sources erroneously list L.f. (Carolus Linnaeus the Younger's standard author abbreviation) as the author of the genus, but the Australian Plant Name Index (APNI) has the correct citation The first species placed in the genus was F. sedifolia, which would remain the only species in the genus for 72 years. The English botanist Sir Joseph Dalton Hooker described three new species: F. bellidifolia in 1852 and F. bidwillii and F. tenella in 1853.

There was an uncertainty among botanists whether these plants belonged in one genus or two. The first instance of such uncertainty began when Ferdinand von Mueller moved F. sedifolia and F. bellidifolia to Phyllachne in 1874. In 1889, Selmar Schönland reduced the genus itself to a section of Phyllachne under the name Phyllachne sect. Forstera in Engler and Prantl's Die Natürlichen Pflanzenfamilien. The moves established what later taxonomists would come to realize: that these two genera are closely related. By Johannes Mildbraed's 1908 taxonomic monograph on the family in Engler's Das Pflanzenreich, all four species known at the time were placed back into Forstera. The last species in this genus to be described was F. mackayii in 1935 by Harry Allan, bringing the total to five species.
