= Alsophila macgregorii =

Scientific classification
- Kingdom: Plantae
- Clade: Tracheophytes
- Division: Polypodiophyta
- Class: Polypodiopsida
- Order: Cyatheales
- Family: Cyatheaceae
- Genus: Alsophila
- Species: A. macgregorii

Binomial name
- Alsophila macgregorii (F.Muell.) R.M.Tryon

Synonyms
- Cyathea cheilanthoides Copel.; Cyathea keysseri Rosenst.; Cyathea macgregorii F.Muell.

Species of fern

Alsophila macgregorii, synonym Cyathea macgregorii, is a species of tree fern in the family Cyatheaceae. Its trunk is approximately 3 meters tall and about 24 centimeters thick. It has narrow and tripinnate fronds which are about 1 meter long, occurring in clusters of approximately 60, and form a round crown. The stipe is scaly and warty, scales being either smooth and shiny brown or small and pale. The sori are in groups of four to six in pinnule lobes. They are covered in brown indusia. It bears similarity to Alsophila imbricata and even greater similarity to Alsophila gleichenioides. It is possible that these variations are only due to differences in habitat and they may be same species.

== Distribution ==
The species occurs in New Guinea peaty grasslands or forest edges from 3000 to 3700 meters. It has a tendency to form groups.

== Name ==
Its name comes from William MacGregor (1846–1919) who was a plant collector active in New Guinea.
