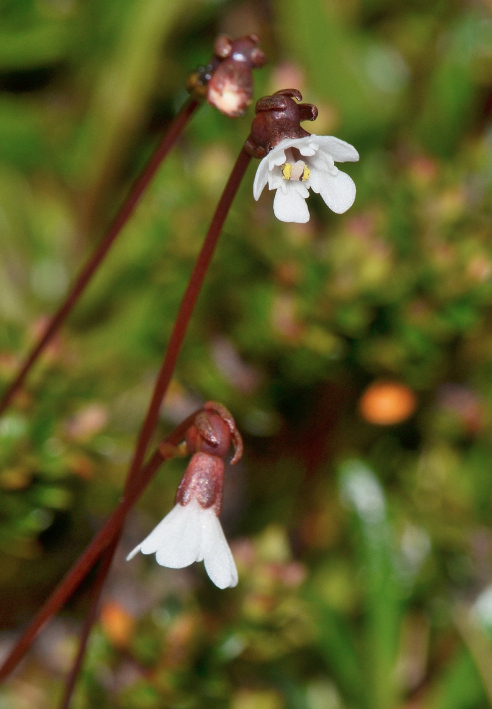
- Flowering in Hartz Mountains National Park, Tasmania, Australia
- An illustration from Johannes Mildbraed's 1908 monograph on the Stylidiaceae.

Scientific classification
- Kingdom: Plantae
- Clade: Tracheophytes
- Clade: Angiosperms
- Clade: Eudicots
- Clade: Asterids
- Order: Asterales
- Family: Stylidiaceae
- Genus: Forstera
- Species: F. bellidifolia

Binomial name
- Forstera bellidifolia Hook.

Synonyms
- Phyllachne bellidifolia (Hook.) F.Muell.

= Forstera bellidifolia =

Species of flowering plant

Forstera bellidifolia, the Tasmanian forstera, is a species in the family Stylidiaceae that is endemic to Tasmania, Australia. It was described by William Jackson Hooker in an 1851 volume of Icones Plantarum. It is notably different from other members of the genus in that it is not native to New Zealand nor does it possess the epigynous nectaries that are present in the other species.

Forstera bellidifolia is a glabrous perennial plant with oblong-spathulate leaves arranged in a basal rosette. Scapes are usually 5 to 10 cm (2.0 to 3.9 in) tall, with some as short as 3 cm (1.2 in) and as tall as 18 cm (7.1 in), upon which white flowers are borne from November to March that fruit from February to April. Forstera bellidifolia is endemic to Tasmania and is widespread but primarily located in the mountainous regions of Western and Southwestern Tasmania in the Tasmanian Central Highlands, Tasmanian Northern Slopes, and Tasmanian West biogeographical regions. It can be found growing from sea level to approximately 1,200 m (3,900 ft) in shaded seepages and pool margins, frequently in cushion plant mounds.
