= Neoregelia brownii =

Scientific classification
- Kingdom: Plantae
- Clade: Embryophytes
- Clade: Tracheophytes
- Clade: Spermatophytes
- Clade: Angiosperms
- Clade: Monocots
- Clade: Commelinids
- Order: Poales
- Family: Bromeliaceae
- Genus: Neoregelia
- Subgenus: Neoregelia subg. Longipetalopsis
- Species: N. brownii

Binomial name
- Neoregelia brownii Leme

Species of flowering plant

Neoregelia brownii is a species of plant in the bromeliad family. It is endemic to southeastern Brazil. The specific epithet honors Gregory K. Brown, a North American botanist and one of the collectors of the species.
