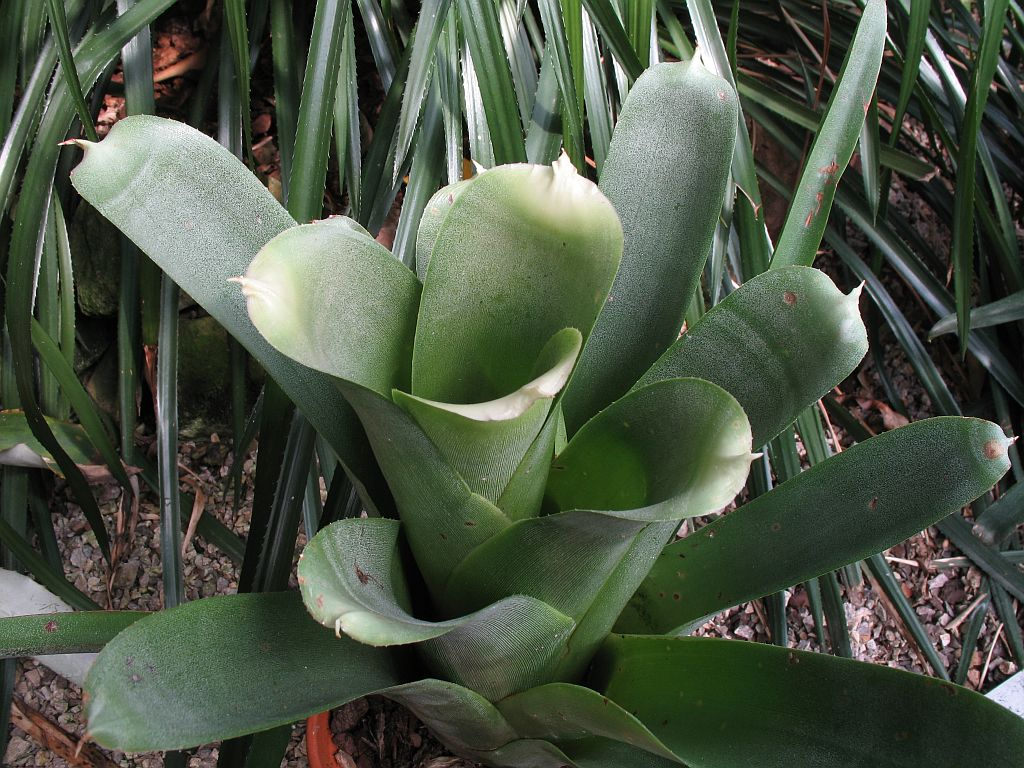

Conservation status
- Least Concern (IUCN 3.1)

Scientific classification
- Kingdom: Plantae
- Clade: Embryophytes
- Clade: Tracheophytes
- Clade: Spermatophytes
- Clade: Angiosperms
- Clade: Monocots
- Clade: Commelinids
- Order: Poales
- Family: Bromeliaceae
- Genus: Neoregelia
- Subgenus: Neoregelia subg. Longipetalopsis
- Species: N. bahiana

Binomial name
- Neoregelia bahiana (Ule) L.B.Sm.

= Neoregelia bahiana =

Species of flowering plant

Neoregelia bahiana is a species of flowering plant in the genus Neoregelia.

== Cultivars ==
- Neoregelia 'Brazilian Pepper'
- Neoregelia 'Lovely K'
- Neoregelia 'Nutmeg'
