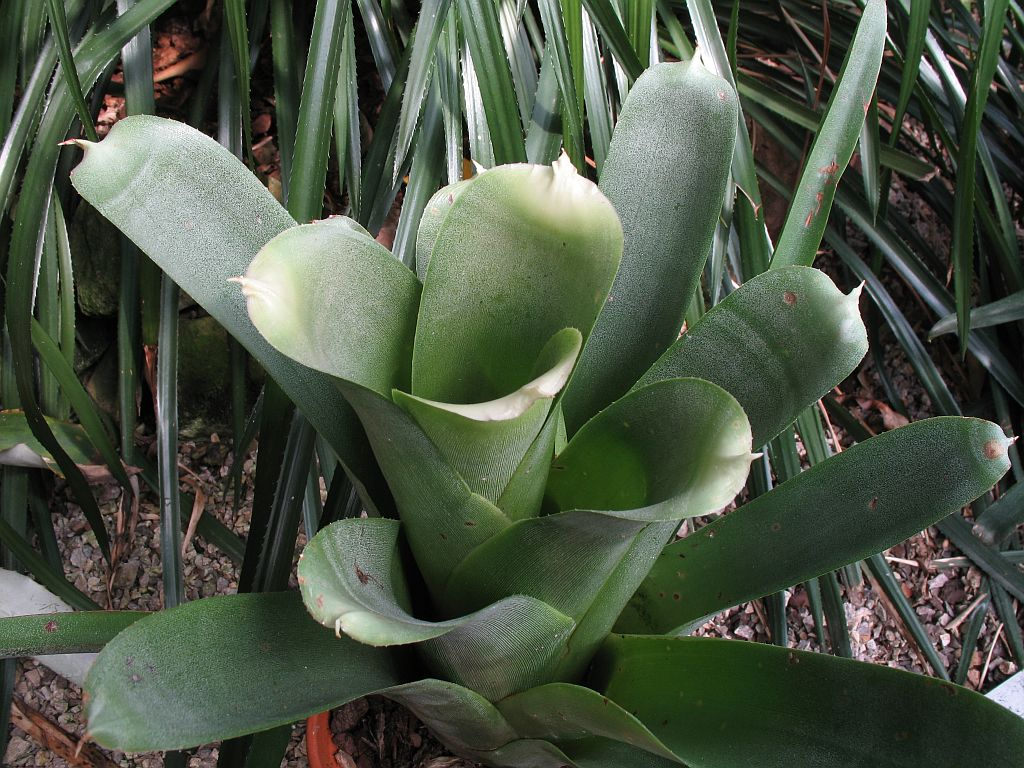
- Neoregelia bahiana

Scientific classification
- Kingdom: Plantae
- Clade: Tracheophytes
- Clade: Angiosperms
- Clade: Monocots
- Clade: Commelinids
- Order: Poales
- Family: Bromeliaceae
- Genus: Neoregelia
- Subgenus: Neoregelia subg. Longipetalopsis; Leme

Species
- See text

= Neoregelia subg. Longipetalopsis =

Subgenus of flowering plants

Neoregelia subg. Longipetalopsis is a subgenus of the genus Neoregelia.

== Species ==
Species accepted by Encyclopedia of Bromeliads as of October 2022:

- Neoregelia altocaririensis Leme & L. Kollmann
- Neoregelia azevedoi Leme
- Neoregelia bahiana (Ule) L.B.Sm.
- Neoregelia bragarum (E.Pereira & L.B.Sm.) Leme
- Neoregelia brigadeirensis Paula & Leme
- Neoregelia brownii Leme
- Neoregelia dayvidiana Leme & A.P.Fontana
- Neoregelia diversifolia E.Pereira
- Neoregelia gigas Leme & L.Kollmann
- Neoregelia ibitipocensis (Leme) Leme
- Neoregelia inexspectata Leme
- Neoregelia kerryi Leme
- Neoregelia longipedicellata Leme
- Neoregelia menescalii Leme
- Neoregelia mucugensis Leme
- Neoregelia paulistana E.Pereira
- Neoregelia pernambucana Leme & J.A.Siqueira
- Neoregelia retrorsa Leme & L.Kollmann
- Neoregelia rothinessa Leme, H.Luther & W.Till
- Neoregelia rubrovittata Leme
- Neoregelia silvimontana Leme & J.A.Siqueira (as Neoregelia silvomontana)
- Neoregelia tenebrosa Leme
- Neoregelia viridolineata Leme
- Neoregelia viridovinosa Leme & L.Kollmann
