= Stylidium semaphorum =

Conservation status
- Declared rare (DEC)

Scientific classification
- Kingdom: Plantae
- Clade: Tracheophytes
- Clade: Angiosperms
- Clade: Eudicots
- Clade: Asterids
- Order: Asterales
- Family: Stylidiaceae
- Genus: Stylidium
- Subgenus: Stylidium subg. Forsteropsis
- Species: S. semaphorum

Binomial name
- Stylidium semaphorum Lowrie & Kenneally 1997

Species of carnivorous plant

Stylidium semaphorum is a species that belongs to the genus Stylidium (family Stylidiaceae). The specific epithet semaphorum is Greek for "sign-bearing" and refers to the flower shape, which appears to have to be positioned in a V-shape, a semaphore code for "attention". It is an herbaceous perennial that grows 5–18 cm tall and has divided stems covered with tile-like leaves that are arranged in a spiral formation around the stem. The narrowly ovate leaves are basifixed and held closely against the stems. The leaves are around 2.0–2.3 mm long and 0.5–0.7 mm wide. The terminal inflorescences are spike-like racemes and produce flowers that are pale pink or white and bloom from September to October in their native range. S. semaphorum is only known from its type location in south-western Western Australia. The only population recorded is within the bounds of a nature reserve. Because of its small population levels, the government has declared this species to be rare in the wild, which is similar to a status of threatened, vulnerable, or endangered. Its habitat is recorded as being laterite gravel soils on a hill summit in the company with Banksia sessilis. S. semaphorum is distinct within its subgenus because it possesses sepals with short brownish apical mucro.

== See also ==
- List of Stylidium species
