= Alsophila gleichenioides =

Scientific classification
- Kingdom: Plantae
- Clade: Tracheophytes
- Division: Polypodiophyta
- Class: Polypodiopsida
- Order: Cyatheales
- Family: Cyatheaceae
- Genus: Alsophila
- Species: A. gleichenioides

Binomial name
- Alsophila gleichenioides (C.Chr.) R.M.Tryon

Synonyms
- Cyathea gleichenioides C.Chr.

Species of fern

Alsophila gleichenioides, synonym Cyathea gleichenioides, is a species of tree fern endemic to New Guinea, where it grows in open peaty grassland and on forest margins, often in groups, at an altitude of 2800–3700 m. The trunk of this plant is erect, up to 3 m tall and about 24 cm in diameter. The narrow fronds are tripinnate and about 1 m in length. Around 60 fronds form a rounded crown. The stipe is warty and bears scattered scales towards the base. These scales may be either glossy brown with a paler dull margin, or small, pale and fringed. Sori occur one or two per fertile pinnule and are protected by firm, brown indusia.

A. gleichenioides is a variable species, similar to Alsophila imbricata. However, Alsophila macgregorii is thought to be its closest relative, differing only in minor details of frond morphology. Large and Braggins (2004) note that it is possible these variations are simply ecological, in which case the two taxa are conspecific and should be united.
