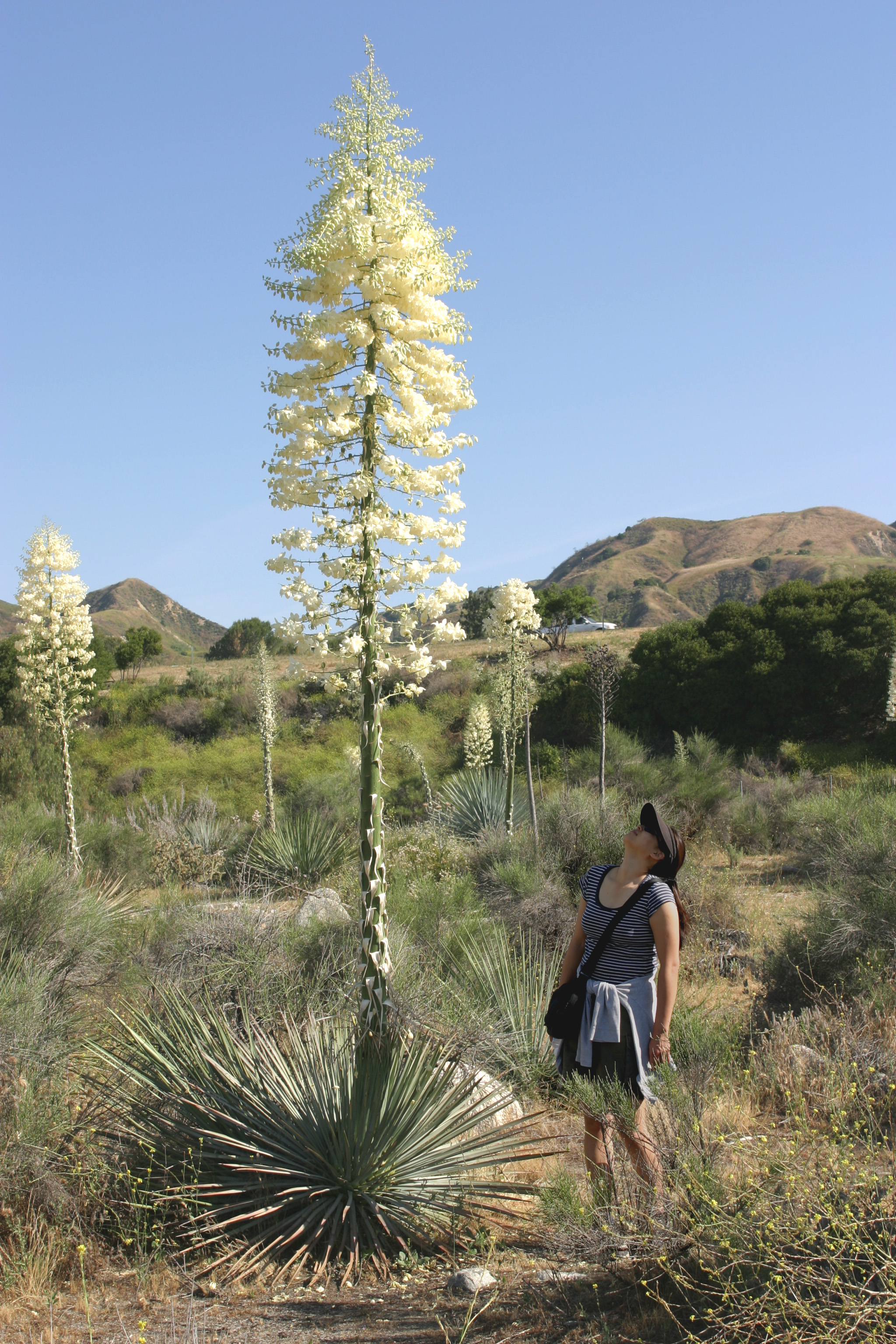
- Hesperoyucca whipplei

Scientific classification
- Kingdom: Plantae
- Clade: Embryophytes
- Clade: Tracheophytes
- Clade: Spermatophytes
- Clade: Angiosperms
- Clade: Monocots
- Order: Asparagales
- Family: Asparagaceae
- Subfamily: Agavoideae
- Genus: Hesperoyucca (Engelmann) Baker

Synonyms
- Yucca sect. Hesperoyucca Engelm.

= Hesperoyucca =

Genus of flowering plants

Hesperoyucca is a small genus of two recognized species of flowering plants closely related to, and recently split from, Yucca, which is in the century plant subfamily within the asparagus family.

== Description ==
Hesperoyucca is distinct from Yucca in having loculicidally dehiscent fruit and a scape more than 2.5 cm (1 in) diameter with reflexed (not erect) bracts. The stigma is capitate, whereas those of Yucca split into three reflexed lobes. The glutinous pollen is released in a sticky mass; that of Yucca species is released as single grains. The genus is native to Mexico and the southwestern United States.

Species

- Hesperoyucca newberryi (McKelvey) Clary (syn. H. whipplei subsp. newberryi, Yucca newberryi ) – northwestern Arizona
- Hesperoyucca peninsularis (McKelvery) Clary (syn. Yucca whipplei ssp. eremica) – peninsular candle – Baja California, Baja California Sur
- Hesperoyucca whipplei (Torr.) Trel. (syn. Yucca whipplei) – chaparral yucca, our Lord's candle or Spanish bayonet – southern California, Baja California

== Taxonomy ==
The taxonomy of Hesperoyucca is complex and somewhat controversial. Originally, in 1871, George Engelmann ranked "Hespero-Yucca" as a section of Yucca (with only one member, Yucca whipplei; all other Yucca species he placed in section Eu-Yucca, with three subgroups). In 1895 he revised his classification of Yucca, to four equal groups, of which Hesperoyucca was one. In 1876, John Gilbert Baker gave it the rank of subgenus; in 1892 he noted that it "had better be kept as a genus distinct from Yucca" (but actually retained the name Y. whippleii [sic]).

Some authorities accept this as having erected the genus Hesperoyucca, but others credit this to William Trelease, who printed a taxonomic description in 1893, formally recognizing Hesperoyucca as being at the same rank as, but separate from, Yucca. It has taken recent DNA analysis to confirm that they are indeed genetically distinct from Yucca.

The splitting of Hesperoyucca from Yucca is still not widely reflected in available literature or online (for example, the British Royal Botanic Gardens, Kew and the Royal Horticultural Society websites do not recognize the name as current).
