= Stylidium imbricatum =

Scientific classification
- Kingdom: Plantae
- Clade: Tracheophytes
- Clade: Angiosperms
- Clade: Eudicots
- Clade: Asterids
- Order: Asterales
- Family: Stylidiaceae
- Genus: Stylidium
- Subgenus: Stylidium subg. Forsteropsis
- Species: S. imbricatum

Binomial name
- Stylidium imbricatum Benth.

Synonyms
- Condollea imbricata (Benth.) F.Muell.

Species of carnivorous plant

Stylidium imbricatum, the tile-leaved triggerplant, is a dicotyledonous plant that belongs to the genus Stylidium (family Stylidiaceae). It is an herbaceous perennial that grows from 12 to 50 cm tall and has divided stems covered with tile-like leaves that are arranged in a spiral formation around the stem. The ovate-elliptic leaves are basifixed and held closely against the stems. The leaves are around 1.5-1.8 mm long and 0.6-0.8 mm wide. Terminal inflorescences are racemose or spike-like and produce flowers that are reddish violet with laterally-paired lobes and bloom from April to May in their native range. S. imbricatum is only known from south-western Western Australia in Stirling Range National Park and Porongurup National Park south-east to Cheynes Beach. Its habitat is recorded as being sandy or laterite soils in swampy areas, rocky slopes, or heathland. S. imbricatum is distinct within its subgenus because it possesses obovate sepals. Its conservation status has been assessed as secure.

== See also ==
- List of Stylidium species
