= Alsophila imbricata =

Scientific classification
- Kingdom: Plantae
- Clade: Tracheophytes
- Division: Polypodiophyta
- Class: Polypodiopsida
- Order: Cyatheales
- Family: Cyatheaceae
- Genus: Alsophila
- Species: A. imbricata

Binomial name
- Alsophila imbricata (Alderw.) R.M.Tryon

Synonyms
- Cyathea imbricata Alderw.

Species of fern

Alsophila imbricata, synonym Cyathea imbricata, is a species of tree fern endemic to Western New Guinea, where it grows in open forest at an altitude of 3240 m. The trunk of this plant is erect and approximately 2 m tall. Fronds may be bi- or tripinnate and are usually less than 1 m in length. The stipe is dark, spiny, and covered with caducous scales. These scales are glossy brown in colouration and have a paler margin and fragile edges. Sori are borne in groups of one to four per pinnule lobe. They are protected by firm indusia.

A. imbricata is similar to Alsophila macgregorii and very similar to Alsophila gleichenioides. It differs from the latter only in details of frond morphology. Large and Braggins (2004) note that "it is possible these variations are ecological and that the species should be united".
