= Stylidium subg. Forsteropsis =

Scientific classification
- Kingdom: Plantae
- Clade: Tracheophytes
- Clade: Angiosperms
- Clade: Eudicots
- Clade: Asterids
- Order: Asterales
- Family: Stylidiaceae
- Genus: Stylidium
- Subgenus: Stylidium subg. Forsteropsis (Sond.) Mildbr.

Type species
- Stylidium preissii (Sond.) F.Muell.

Species
- Stylidium imbricatum Stylidium leeuwinense Stylidium marradongense Stylidium preissii Stylidium semaphorum

Synonyms
- Stylidium ser. Imbricatae Benth.

Subgenus of flowering plants

Stylidium subg. Forsteropsis, as circumscribed by Allen Lowrie and Kevin Kenneally, contains five species of triggerplants from south-western Australia that are characterized by their tightly appressed leaves arranged in a spiral around the stem. This subgenus was originally described by Otto Wilhelm Sonder in 1845 as the genus Forsteropsis.

== See also ==
- List of Stylidium species
