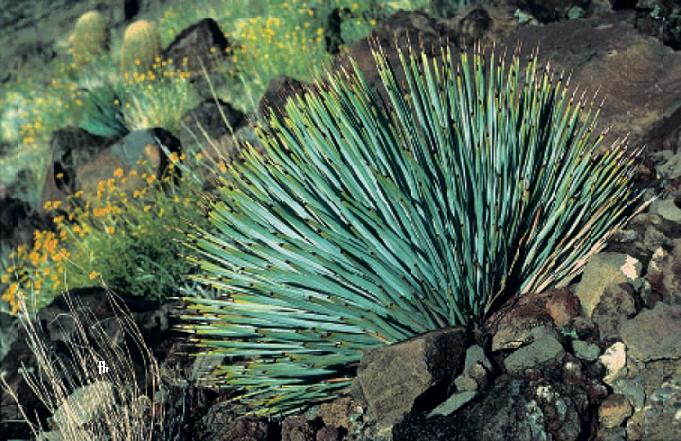

Scientific classification
- Kingdom: Plantae
- Clade: Tracheophytes
- Clade: Angiosperms
- Clade: Monocots
- Order: Asparagales
- Family: Asparagaceae
- Subfamily: Agavoideae
- Genus: Hesperoyucca
- Species: H. newberryi

Binomial name
- Hesperoyucca newberryi (McKelvey) Clary

Synonyms
- Yucca newberryi McKelvey; Yucca whipplei subsp. newberryi (McKelvey) Hochstätter

= Hesperoyucca newberryi =

Grand Canyon Quixote plant

Species of flowering plant

Hesperoyucca newberryi, commonly known as the Grand Canyon Quixote plant or Newberry's yucca, is a plant species endemic to Arizona. It is found only in Mohave and Coconino Counties, on the walls of canyons near the Colorado River.

Hesperoyucca newberryi is a perennial forming a rosette. It is semelparous (flowering once then dying). Leaves are narrow, up to 60 cm (24 in) long but usually less than 3 cm (1.2 in) across. Flowering stalks are up to 160 cm (63 in) tall, bearing cream-colored flowers. The fruit is a dry, egg-shaped capsule about 4 cm (1.6 in) long.
