= Stylidium preissii =

Scientific classification
- Kingdom: Plantae
- Clade: Tracheophytes
- Clade: Angiosperms
- Clade: Eudicots
- Clade: Asterids
- Order: Asterales
- Family: Stylidiaceae
- Genus: Stylidium
- Subgenus: Stylidium subg. Forsteropsis
- Species: S. preissii

Binomial name
- Stylidium preissii (Sond.) F.Muell. 1863

Synonyms
- Forsteropsis preissii Sond. 1845

Species of carnivorous plant

Stylidium preissii, the lizard triggerplant, is a species that belongs to the genus Stylidium (family Stylidiaceae). It is an herbaceous perennial that grows from 5–18 cm tall and has divided stems covered with tile-like leaves that are arranged in a spiral formation around the stem. The broadly trullate leaves are basifixed and held closely against the stems. The leaves are around 1.9 mm long and 1.0 mm wide. Inflorescences are umbellate racemes and produce flowers that are white, pale pink, or dark pink and bloom from November to December in their native range. S. preissii is only known from south-western Western Australia from Bremer Bay to Israelite Bay with a few populations near Jandakot. Its habitat is recorded as being white sandy soils in open heathland. S. preissii is distinct within its subgenus because it possesses a strap-like gynostemium column with a dilated cunabulum.

== See also ==
- List of Stylidium species
