= Phyllachne =

- Phyllachne colensoi illustration from Johannes Mildbraed's 1908 monograph on the Stylidiaceae.

Scientific classification
- Kingdom: Plantae
- Clade: Embryophytes
- Clade: Tracheophytes
- Clade: Angiosperms
- Clade: Eudicots
- Clade: Asterids
- Order: Asterales
- Family: Stylidiaceae
- Subfamily: Stylidioideae
- Genus: Phyllachne; J.R.Forst. & G.Forst.

Type species
- Phyllachne uliginosa J.R.Forst. & G.Forst.

Species
- Phyllachne clavigera Phyllachne colensoi Phyllachne rubra Phyllachne uliginosa

Genus of flowering plants

Phyllachne is a genus of four cushion plant species in the family Stylidiaceae. Of the four species, two are endemic to New Zealand, while P. colensoi is also native to Tasmania and P. uliginosa is entirely endemic to southern South America and is the only species in the Stylidiaceae native to the Americas. The movement of P. colensoi to colonize Tasmania is a relatively recent move. Molecular studies group P. colensoi, P. clavigera, and P. rubra together in one clade with P. uliginosa in the sister clade. Based on molecular clock data of the rbcL gene, it is estimated that P. uliginosa last shared a common ancestor with the New Zealand clade about 6 million years ago.
