= Sven Berggren =

Swedish botanist (1837–1917)

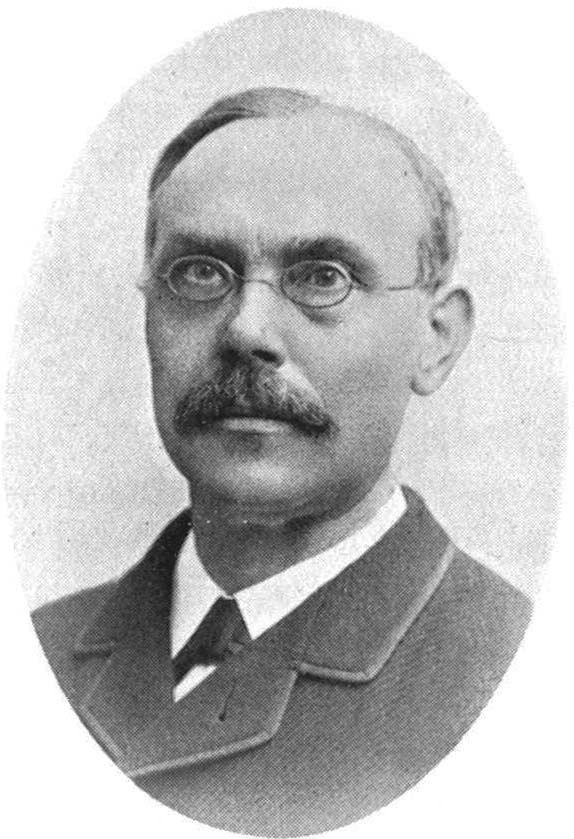
Sven Berggren.

Sven Berggren (12 August 1837 – 28 June 1917) was a Swedish botanist, explorer and university professor. He was a professor at Lund University 1883–1902, later at Uppsala University. He was elected a member of the Royal Swedish Academy of Sciences in 1880.

He collected plants on a number of journeys to then little-known areas of the world, e.g. Svalbard in 1868, Greenland in 1870 (both times with Nordenskiöld's expedition) and, in 1873, New Zealand, Australia, Hawaii and California. In 1874 Berggren distributed bryophyte specimens which belong to a series which superficially resemble an exsiccata work with the title Plantae in Itineribus Suecorum Polaribus collectae. He made particularly novel collections and descriptions of bryophytes and to less extent vascular plants, algae and fungi. His collections are kept at Lund University.

== Selected works ==
- Musci et Hepaticæ Spetsbergenses - Bericht über die Untersuchung den Moosflora Spitzbergens und Beeren-Eilands während der schwedischen Expeditionen 1864 und 1868, und Verzeichniss den dort gesammelten Arten. Kungliga svenska Vetenskapsakademiens Handlingar N.S., vol. 13 (7), Stockholm, 1875.
- Undersökning af mossfloran vid Disko-bugten och Auleitsivikfjorden i Grönland. Kungliga svenska Vetenskapsakademiens Handlingar N.S., vol. 13 (8), Stockholm, 1875.
- On New Zealand Hepaticæ I. Lund, 1898.
