= List of Stylidium species =

Discovery and description of new Stylidium species has been occurring since the late 18th century, the first of which was discovered in Botany Bay in 1770 and described by Joseph Banks and Daniel Solander. In the early 19th century, the French botanist Charles François Antoine Morren described triggerplant anatomy, also providing illustrations with the descriptions. As of December 2024, 289 species were accepted in the genus Stylidium. There are also several more species that are awaiting a formal description.

== List of species ==
The following species are recognised in the genus Stylidium:

== A ==
- Stylidium accedens A.R.Bean
- Stylidium aceratum Lowrie & Kenneally
- Stylidium acuminatum (Carlquist) Wege
- Stylidium adenophorum Lowrie & Kenneally
- Stylidium adnatum R.Br. - beaked triggerplant
- Stylidium adpressum Benth. - trigger-on-stilts
- Stylidium aeonioides Carlquist
- Stylidium affine Sond. - queen triggerplant
- Stylidium albolilacinum (F.L.Erickson & J.H.Willis) Lowrie & Carlquist
- Stylidium albomontis Carlquist
- Stylidium alsinoides R.Br.
- Stylidium amabile Wege & D.J.Coates
- Stylidium amoenum R.Br. - lovely (or beautiful) triggerplant
- Stylidium amphora Lowrie & Kenneally
- Stylidium androsaceum Lindl.
- Stylidium angustifolium (Carlquist) Wege
- Stylidium applanatum Wege
- Stylidium aquaticum A.R.Bean
- Stylidium araeophyllum Wege
- Stylidium arenicola Carlquist
- Stylidium armeria (Labill.) Labill.
- Stylidium articulatum R.Br. - stout triggerplant
- Stylidium assimile R.Br. - bronze-leaved triggerplant
- Stylidium asymmetricum Wege - asymmetric triggerplant
- Stylidium austrocapense A.R.Bean

== B ==
- Stylidium barleei F.Muell. - tooth-leaved triggerplant
- Stylidium barrettiorum Lowrie & Kenneally
- Stylidium beaugleholei J.H.Willis
- Stylidium bellum Wege
- Stylidium bicolor Lindl.
- Stylidium bindoon Lowrie & Kenneally
- Stylidium breviscapum R.Br. - boomerang triggerplant
- Stylidium brunonianum Benth. - pink fountain triggerplant
- Stylidium bulbiferum Benth. - circus triggerplant
- Stylidium burbidgeanum Lowrie & Kenneally

== C ==
- Stylidium caespitosum R.Br. - fly-away triggerplant
- Stylidium calcaratum R.Br. - book triggerplant
- Stylidium candelabrum Lowrie & Kenneally
- Stylidium capillare R.Br.
- Stylidium caricifolium Lindl. - milkmaids
- Stylidium carlquistii Lowrie
- Stylidium carnosum Benth. - fleshy-leaved triggerplant
- Stylidium centrolepoides A.R.Bean
- Stylidium ceratophorum O.Schwarz
- Stylidium chiddarcoopingense Lowrie, D.J.Coates & Kenneally
- Stylidium choreanthum F.L.Erickson & J.H.Willis - dancing triggerplant
- Stylidium ciliatum Lindl. - golden triggerplant
- Stylidium cilium Lowrie, A.H.Burb. & Kenneally
- Stylidium clarksonii Lowrie & Kenneally
- Stylidium clavatum (Carlquist) Wege
- Stylidium claytonioides W.Fitzg.
- Stylidium confertum A.R.Bean
- Stylidium confluens Banyard & S.H.James
- Stylidium cordifolium W.Fitzg.
- Stylidium cornuatum Wege
- Stylidium coroniforme F.L.Erickson & J.H.Willis - Wongan Hills triggerplant
- Stylidium corymbosum R.Br. - whitecaps
- Stylidium costulatum Kenneally & Lowrie
- Stylidium crassifolium R.Br. - thick-leaved triggerplant
- Stylidium crossocephalum F.Muell. - posy triggerplant
- Stylidium cygnorum W.Fitzg.
- Stylidium cymiferum Lowrie & Carlquist

== D ==
- Stylidium daphne Lowrie & Kenneally
- Stylidium darwinii Punekar & Lakshmin.
- Stylidium debile F.Muell.
- Stylidium decipiens (Carlquist) Wege
- Stylidium delicatum A.R.Bean
- Stylidium desertorum Carlquist
- Stylidium despectum R.Br. - dwarf triggerplant
- Stylidium diademum Wege
- Stylidium diceratum Lowrie & Kenneally
- Stylidium dichotomum DC. - pins-and-needles
- Stylidium dielsianum E.Pritz. - tangle triggerplant
- Stylidium diffusum R.Br.
- Stylidium diplectroglossum (F.L.Erickson & J.H.Willis) Lowrie, A.H.Burb. & Kenneally
- Stylidium diplotrichum Wege
- Stylidium dispermum F.Muell.
- Stylidium diuroides Lindl. - donkey triggerplant
- Stylidium divaricatum Sond. - daddy-long-legs
- Stylidium divergens A.R.Bean
- Stylidium diversifolium R.Br. - touch-me-not
- Stylidium drummondianum Lowrie & Carlquist
- Stylidium dunlopianum Carlquist

== E ==
- Stylidium ecorne (F.Muell. ex F.L.Erickson & J.H.Willis) P.G.Farrell & S.H.James - foot triggerplant
- Stylidium edentatum Lowrie & Carlquist
- Stylidium eglandulosum F.Muell. - woolly-stemmed triggerplant
- Stylidium elachophyllum A.R.Bean & M.T.Mathieson
- Stylidium elongatum Benth. - tall triggerplant
- Stylidium emarginatum Sond.
- Stylidium ensatum A.R.Bean
- Stylidium ericksoniae J.H.Willis
- Stylidium eriorhizum R.Br.
- Stylidium exappendiculatum (Lowrie & Carlquist) Wege
- Stylidium exiguum A.R.Bean
- Stylidium expeditionis Carlquist - Tutanning triggerplant

== F ==
- Stylidium falcatum R.Br. - slender beaked triggerplant
- Stylidium fasciculatum R.Br.
- Stylidium ferricola Wege & Keighery
- Stylidium fimbriatum Lowrie & Kenneally
- Stylidium fissilobum F.Muell.
- Stylidium flagellum Lowrie, A.H.Burb. & Kenneally
- Stylidium floodii F.Muell.
- Stylidium floribundum R.Br.
- Stylidium fluminense F.L.Erickson & J.H.Willis
- Stylidium foveolatum A.R.Bean

== G ==
- Stylidium galioides C.A.Gardner - yellow mountain triggerplant
- Stylidium glabrifolium Lowrie & Kenneally
- Stylidium glandulosissimum Wege
- Stylidium glandulosum Salisb. - bushy triggerplant
- Stylidium glaucum (Labill.) Labill. - grey triggerplant
- Stylidium gloeophyllum Wege
- Stylidium graminifolium Sw. ex Willd. - grass triggerplant
- Stylidium guttatum R.Br. - dotted triggerplant

== H ==
- Stylidium hesperium Wege
- Stylidium hirsutum R.Br. - hairy triggerplant
- Stylidium hispidum Lindl. - white butterfly triggerplant
- Stylidium hortiorum Lowrie & Kenneally
- Stylidium humphreysii Carlquist
- Stylidium hygrophilum Wege
- Stylidium hymenocraspedum Wege

== I ==
- Stylidium imbricatum Benth. - tile-leaved triggerplant
- Stylidium inaequipetalum J.M.Black
- Stylidium inconspicuum Slooten
- Stylidium induratum M.B.Scott - desert triggerplant
- Stylidium insensitivum Carlquist - insensitive triggerplant
- Stylidium inundatum R.Br. - hundreds and thousands
- Stylidium inversiflorum Carlquist
- Stylidium involucratum F.Muell.
- Stylidium ireneae Lowrie & Kenneally

== J ==
- Stylidium javanicum Slooten
- Stylidium junceum R.Br. - reed triggerplant

== K ==
- Stylidium kalbarriense Lowrie & Kenneally
- Stylidium keigheryi Lowrie & Carlquist
- Stylidium korijekup Wege, B.J.Keighery & Keighery

== L ==
- Stylidium lachnopodum Domin
- Stylidium laciniatum C.A.Gardner - tattered triggerplant
- Stylidium laricifolium Rich. - tree (or larch-leaf) triggerplant
- Stylidium lateriticola Kenneally
- Stylidium latrodectus R.L.Barrett, M.D.Barrett & Lowrie
- Stylidium leeuwinense Lowrie & Kenneally
- Stylidium leiophyllum A.R.Bean
- Stylidium lepidum F.Muell. ex Benth. - redcaps
- Stylidium leptocalyx Sond. - slender-calyxed triggerplant
- Stylidium leptophyllum DC. - needle-leaved triggerplant
- Stylidium leptorrhizum F.Muell.
- Stylidium limbatum F.Muell. - leaved triggerplant
- Stylidium lineare Sw. ex Willd. - narrow-leaved triggerplant
- Stylidium lineatum Sond. - sunny triggerplant
- Stylidium lithophilum Wege
- Stylidium lobuliflorum F.Muell.
- Stylidium longibracteatum Carlquist - long-bracted triggerplant
- Stylidium longicornu Carlquist
- Stylidium longissimum A.R.Bean
- Stylidium longitubum Benth. - jumping jacks
- Stylidium lowrieanum Carlquist
- Stylidium luteum R.Br. - yellow triggerplant

== M ==
- Stylidium macranthum Carlquist - crab claws
- Stylidium maitlandianum E.Pritz. - fountain triggerplant
- Stylidium maritimum Lowrie, D.J.Coates & Kenneally
- Stylidium marradongense Lowrie & Kenneally
- Stylidium megacarpum Lowrie, A.H.Burb. & Kenneally
- Stylidium merrallii (F.Muell.) T.Durand & B.D.Jacks.Merrall's triggerplant
- Stylidium milleri Wege
- Stylidium miniatum Mildbr. - pink butterfly triggerplant
- Stylidium montanum Raulings & Ladiges
- Stylidium monticola Lowrie & Kenneally
- Stylidium mucronatum Lowrie & Kenneally
- Stylidium multiscapum O.Schwarz
- Stylidium muscicola F.Muell.

== N ==
- Stylidium neglectum Mildbr. - neglected triggerplant
- Stylidium neurophyllum Wege
- Stylidium nitidum Lowrie & Kenneally
- Stylidium nominatum Carlquist
- Stylidium nonscandens Carlquist
- Stylidium notabile A.R.Bean
- Stylidium nungarinense S.Moore - Nungarin triggerplant
- Stylidium nymphaeum Wege

== O ==
- Stylidium obtusatum Sond. - pinafore triggerplant
- Stylidium oreophilum Wege
- Stylidium ornatum S.T.Blake
- Stylidium osculum A.R.Bean
- Stylidium oviflorum A.R.Bean

== P ==
- Stylidium pachyrrhizum F.Muell.
- Stylidium paludicola Wege
- Stylidium paniculatum (Maiden & Betche) A.R.Bean
- Stylidium paulineae Lowrie & Kenneally
- Stylidium pedunculatum R.Br.
- Stylidium pendulum Keighery
- Stylidium periscelianthum F.L.Erickson & J.H.Willis - pantaloon triggerplant
- Stylidium perizoster Lowrie & Kenneally
- Stylidium perplexum Wege
- Stylidium perpusillum Hook.f. - tiny triggerplant
- Stylidium perula Wege
- Stylidium petiolare Sond. - horned triggerplant
- Stylidium piliferum R.Br. - common butterfly triggerplant
- Stylidium pilosum (Labill.) Labill.
- Stylidium pindanicum R.L.Barrett
- Stylidium pingrupense Lowrie, A.H.Burb. & Kenneally
- Stylidium planirosula Wege
- Stylidium plantagineum Sond. - plantagenet triggerplant
- Stylidium ponticulus Lowrie & Kenneally
- Stylidium preissii F.Muell. - lizard triggerplant
- Stylidium pritzelianum Mildbr. - royal triggerplant
- Stylidium productum Hindm. & Blaxell
- Stylidium prophyllum Lowrie & Kenneally
- Stylidium pseudocaespitosum Mildbr.
- Stylidium pseudohirsutum Mildbr.
- Stylidium pseudosacculatum Lowrie, A.H.Burb. & Kenneally
- Stylidium pubigerum Sond. - yellow butterfly triggerplant
- Stylidium pulchellum Sond. - Thumbelina triggerplant
- Stylidium pulviniforme Lowrie & Kenneally
- Stylidium purpureum Wege
- Stylidium pycnostachyum Lindl. - downy triggerplant
- Stylidium pygmaeum R.Br. - pygmy triggerplant

== R ==
- Stylidium ramosissimum A.R.Bean
- Stylidium recurvum Graham
- Stylidium repens R.Br. - matted triggerplant
- Stylidium rhipidium F.L.Erickson & J.H.Willis - fan triggerplant
- Stylidium rhynchocarpum Sond. - black-beaked triggerplant
- Stylidium ricae Carlquist
- Stylidium rigidulum Sond.
- Stylidium rivulosum Lowrie & Kenneally
- Stylidium roseoalatum F.L.Erickson & J.H.Willis - pink-wing triggerplant
- Stylidium roseonanum Carlquist
- Stylidium rosulatum Wege
- Stylidium rotundifolium R.Br.
- Stylidium rubricalyx F.L.Erickson & J.H.Willis
- Stylidium rubriscapum W.Fitzg.
- Stylidium rupestre Sond. - rock triggerplant

== S ==
- Stylidium sacculatum F.L.Erickson & J.H.Willis
- Stylidium saintpaulioides R.L.Barrett, M.D.Barrett & Lowrie
- Stylidium salmoneum Lowrie & Kenneally
- Stylidium scabridum Lindl. - moth triggerplant
- Stylidium scandens R.Br. - climbing triggerplant
- Stylidium scariosum DC.
- Stylidium schizanthum F.Muell.
- Stylidium schoenoides DC. - cow kicks
- Stylidium scintillans Wege
- Stylidium sejunctum Lowrie, D.J.Coates & Kenneally
- Stylidium semaphorum Lowrie & Kenneally
- Stylidium semipartitum F.Muell.
- Stylidium septentrionale (Mildbr.) Lowrie, A.H.Burb. & Kenneally
- Stylidium shepherdianum Wege
- Stylidium simulans Carlquist
- Stylidium soboliferum F.Muell.
- Stylidium spathulatum R.Br. - creamy triggerplant
- Stylidium spiciforme Wege
- Stylidium spinulosum R.Br. - topsy-turvy triggerplant
- Stylidium squamellosum DC. - maze triggerplant
- Stylidium squamosotuberosum Carlquist - fleshy-rhizomed triggerplant
- Stylidium stenophyllum A.R.Bean
- Stylidium stenosepalum E.Pritz.
- Stylidium striatum Lindl. - fan-leaved triggerplant
- Stylidium strigosum Lowrie & Kenneally
- Stylidium subulatum Hook.f.
- Stylidium symonii Carlquist

== T ==
- Stylidium tenellum Sw. ex Willd.
- Stylidium tenerrimum F.Muell.
- Stylidium tenerum Spreng.
- Stylidium tenue Sond.
- Stylidium tenuicarpum Carlquist
- Stylidium tepperianum (F.Muell.) Mildbr.
- Stylidium thesioides DC. - delicate triggerplant
- Stylidium thryonides Wege
- Stylidium thylax Wege
- Stylidium tinkeri Lowrie & Kenneally
- Stylidium torticarpum Lowrie & Kenneally
- Stylidium trichopodum F.Muell.
- Stylidium trudgenii Lowrie & Kenneally
- Stylidium turbinatum Lowrie & Kenneally
- Stylidium turleyae Lowrie & Kenneally
- Stylidium tylosum Lowrie & Kenneally

== U ==
- Stylidium udusicola Lowrie & Kenneally
- Stylidium uliginosum Sw. ex Willd.
- Stylidium uniflorum Sond. - pincushion triggerplant
- Stylidium utricularioides Benth. - pink fan triggerplant

== V ==
- Stylidium validum Wege
- Stylidium velleioides A.R.Bean
- Stylidium verticillatum F.Muell. - pink mountain triggerplant
- Stylidium vinosum Lowrie & Kenneally
- Stylidium violaceum R.Br. - violet triggerplant

== W ==
- Stylidium warriedarense Lowrie, A.H.Burb. & Kenneally
- Stylidium weeliwolli Lowrie & Kenneally
- Stylidium willingii R.L.Barrett, Kenneally & Lowrie
- Stylidium wilroyense Lowrie, D.J.Coates & Kenneally

== X ==
- Stylidium xanthellum Wege
- Stylidium xanthopis F.L.Erickson & J.H.Willis - yellow eyed triggerplant

== Y ==
- Stylidium yilgarnense E.Pritz. - Yilgarn triggerplant

== Z ==
- Stylidium zeicolor F.L.Erickson & J.H.Willis - maize triggerplant
