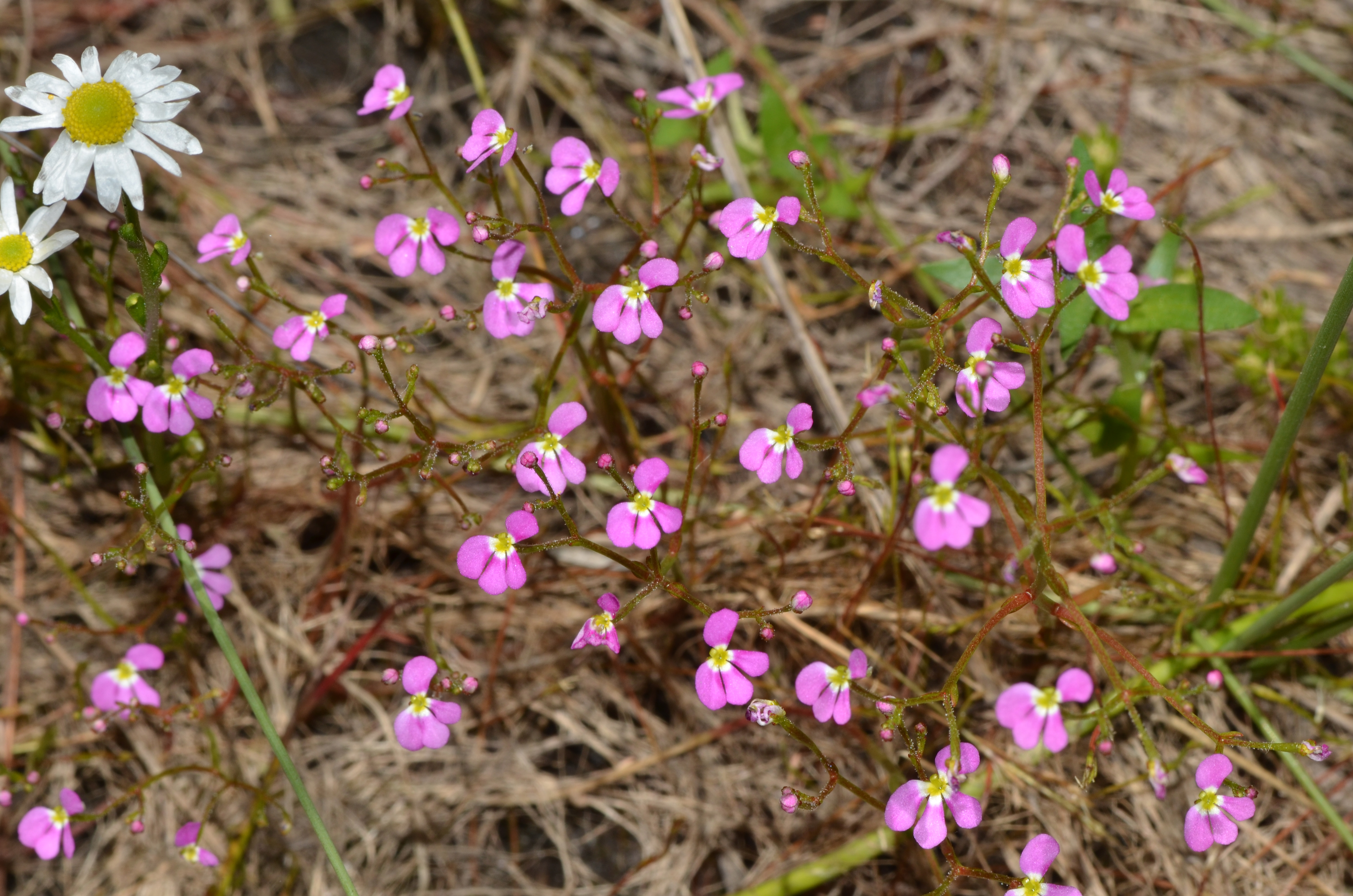

Conservation status
- Priority Two — Poorly Known Taxa (DEC)

Scientific classification
- Kingdom: Plantae
- Clade: Tracheophytes
- Clade: Angiosperms
- Clade: Eudicots
- Clade: Asterids
- Order: Asterales
- Family: Stylidiaceae
- Genus: Stylidium
- Species: S. asymmetricum

Binomial name
- Stylidium asymmetricum Wege

= Stylidium asymmetricum =

Species of carnivorous plant

Stylidium asymmetricum, the asymmetric triggerplant, is a flowering plant species of the genus Stylidium and is endemic to south-west Western Australia. It is an annual plant from 2 to 16 cm (0.8 to 6.3 in) high that grows at the margins of swamps in clay soils. It is only known from two populations in the Northern Jarrah Forest south-west of York and thus it was listed as Priority Two (poorly known taxa) under the Declared Rare and Priority Flora List and more work is necessary to determine the population stability and existing threats, such as feral pigs and off-road vehicles, to the plants. The species epithet asymmetricum refers to the marked asymmetrical corolla arrangement, where the uppermost posterior lobe and the uppermost anterior lobe of the corolla meet at nearly a 90-degree angle, giving the flower a lopsided appearance.

== See also ==
- List of Stylidium species
