= Stylidium exappendiculatum =

Scientific classification
- Kingdom: Plantae
- Clade: Tracheophytes
- Clade: Angiosperms
- Clade: Eudicots
- Clade: Asterids
- Order: Asterales
- Family: Stylidiaceae
- Genus: Stylidium
- Species: S. exappendiculatum

Binomial name
- Stylidium exappendiculatum (Lowrie & Carlquist) Wege

Synonyms
- Stylidium emarginatum subsp. exappendiculatum A. Lowrie & S. Carlquist

Species of flowering plant

Stylidium exappendiculatum is a species of dicotyledonous plant in the genus Stylidium (family Stylidiaceae).

It was first described in 1991 by Allen Lowrie and Sherwin Carlquist as a subspecies of Stylidium emarginatum, and was raised to species level by Juliet Wege in 2012. According to the Catalogue of Life, Stylidium exappendiculatum does not have any known subspecies.
