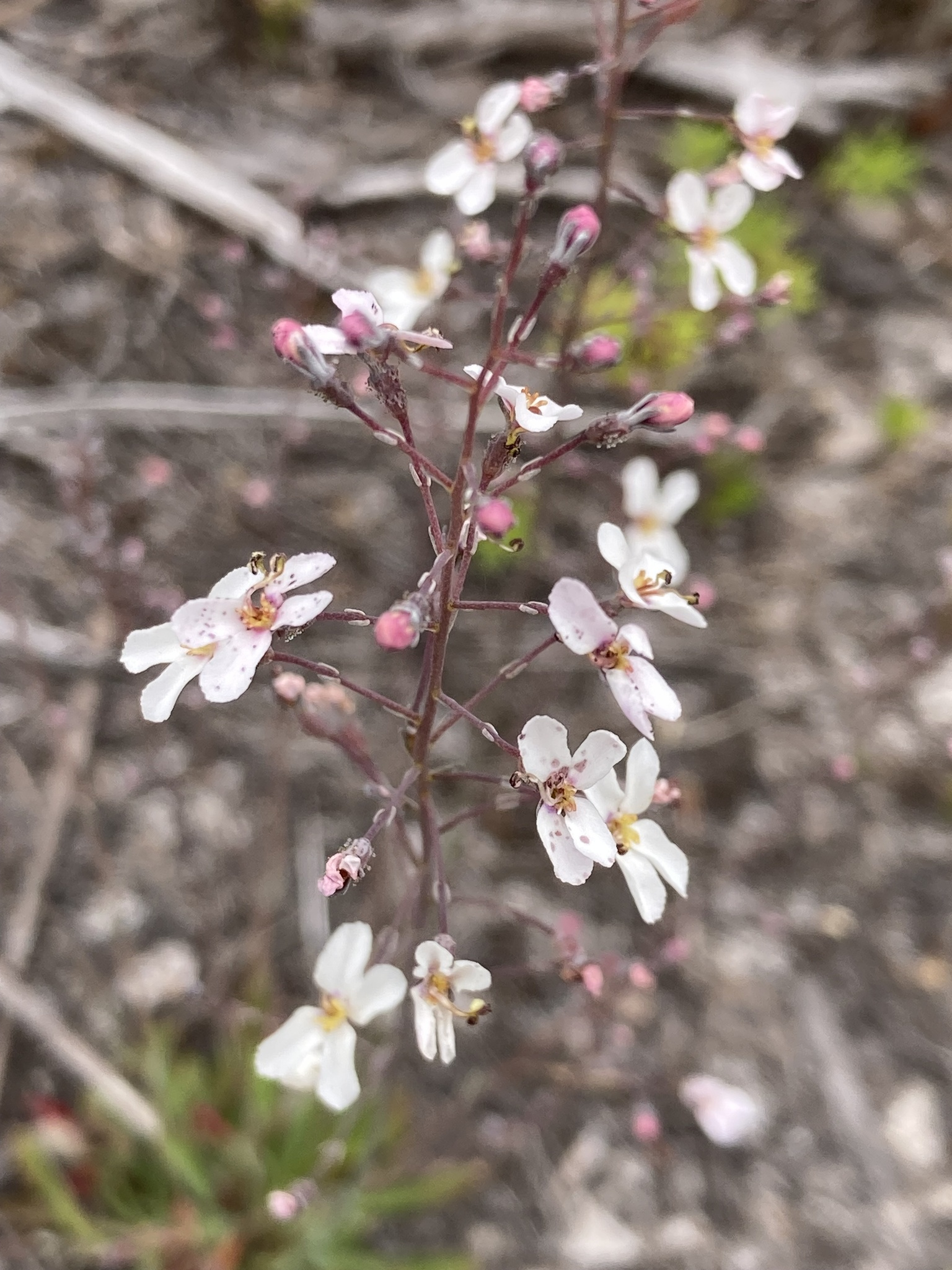

Scientific classification
- Kingdom: Plantae
- Clade: Tracheophytes
- Clade: Angiosperms
- Clade: Eudicots
- Clade: Asterids
- Order: Asterales
- Family: Stylidiaceae
- Genus: Stylidium
- Species: S. glaucum

Binomial name
- Stylidium glaucum (Labill.) Labill.

Synonyms
- Candollea glauca Labill.

= Stylidium glaucum =

Species of carnivorous plant

Stylidium glaucum, the grey triggerplant, is a herbaceous plant found along the southern coast of Southwest Australia, West of Albany. The plant attains a height between 0.15 and 0.65 metres. The leaves are lanceolate in form, becoming pointed at the base, and moderately acute at the tip. These are between 20 and 70 millimetres in length and 2 to 9 millimetres in width, are hairless, and have an entire margin. The trivial name of the species, glaucum, refers to the greyish colour of the leaves. The scape is hairless, supporting a racemose arrangement of white or pink flowers that appear from January to May.

The species is found on peaty sand in seasonally wet, low-lying areas such as swamps or other depressions. This triggerplant is associated with habitat dominated by sedges or Agonis.

Stylidium glaucum was described by Jacques Labillardière in the second volume of Novae Hollandiae Plantarum Specimen, after returning from an expedition to the southern coast of Australia. The type material was, however, not from material he had personally collected, but one currently attributed to another collector, Leschenault de la Tour. This was determined by Juliet Wege in 2010, who noted that this Stylidium species does not occur in the region visited by Labillardière, to the East of Albany, the notes attached to specimens naming "port du roi georges" (King George Sound), and the flowering period accords with the timing of Leschenault's visit.

== See also ==
- List of Stylidium species
