= Stylidium longicornu =

Scientific classification
- Kingdom: Plantae
- Clade: Tracheophytes
- Clade: Angiosperms
- Clade: Eudicots
- Clade: Asterids
- Order: Asterales
- Family: Stylidiaceae
- Genus: Stylidium
- Subgenus: Stylidium subg. Centridium
- Species: S. longicornu

Binomial name
- Stylidium longicornu Carlquist 1979

Species of carnivorous plant

Stylidium longicornu is a dicotyledonous plant that belongs to the genus Stylidium (family Stylidiaceae). It is an annual plant that grows from 10 to 30 cm tall. The obovate to spathulate leaves form a basal rosettes around the stem. The leaves are around 4–6 mm long. Inflorescences are unbranched racemes and produce flowers that are violet with white at the base and bloom from June to August in their native range. S. longicornu is endemic to the Kimberley region in Western Australia. Its habitat is recorded as being sand flats near sandstone. It grows in the presence of S. lobuliflorum, Rhynchospora, and Leptocarpus.

S. longicornu was first described by Sherwin Carlquist in 1979, but he noted that characteristics of this species have been recorded before. The description of S. ceratophorum given by Rica Erickson in 1958 noted that the corolla colour is either orange or mauve with a white throat. All other descriptions and observations of S. ceratophorum have only included colours such as golden-yellow (from dried specimens) or orange in their descriptions of flower colour, indicating that Erickson may have also seen S. longicornu in the field, however this would represent a range expansion beyond where Carlquist had observed it, which he postulated was possible.

== See also ==
- List of Stylidium species
