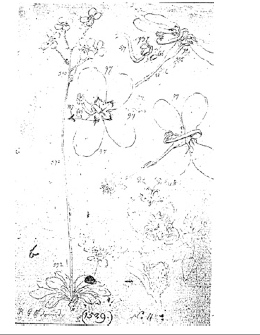
- Ferdinand Bauer's sketch of the species

Scientific classification
- Kingdom: Plantae
- Clade: Tracheophytes
- Clade: Angiosperms
- Clade: Eudicots
- Clade: Asterids
- Order: Asterales
- Family: Stylidiaceae
- Genus: Stylidium
- Subgenus: Stylidium subg. Tolypangium
- Section: Stylidium sect. Saxifragoidea
- Species: S. spathulatum

Binomial name
- Stylidium spathulatum R.Br. 1810

= Stylidium spathulatum =

Species of carnivorous plant

Stylidium spathulatum is a dicotyledonous plant that belongs to the genus Stylidium (family Stylidiaceae). The species is informally named the creamy triggerplant for the colour of its flowers.

The flowers are yellowish-white and appear between October and January. These are presented on a scape, 0.05 to 0.5 metres above the ground, which is glandular at the base and glabrous on the upper parts. The leaves are spathulate, or inversely lance-shaped, tufted and spread out just above ground level. It is found on dunes, granite outcrops, swamps and other moist areas, amongst Eucalypts, heathland or shrubs.

It is found in the Southwest Botanical Province of Western Australia. The species was first described by Robert Brown in his Prodromus Florae Novae Hollandiae of 1810, based on a collection he made in his visit to King George Sound in 1801. This was sketched and annotated for later colouring by the botanical illustrator Ferdinand Bauer, Brown's companion on HMS Investigator. The lectotype's locality is noted as Princess Royal Harbour, King George Sound.

== See also ==
- List of Stylidium species
