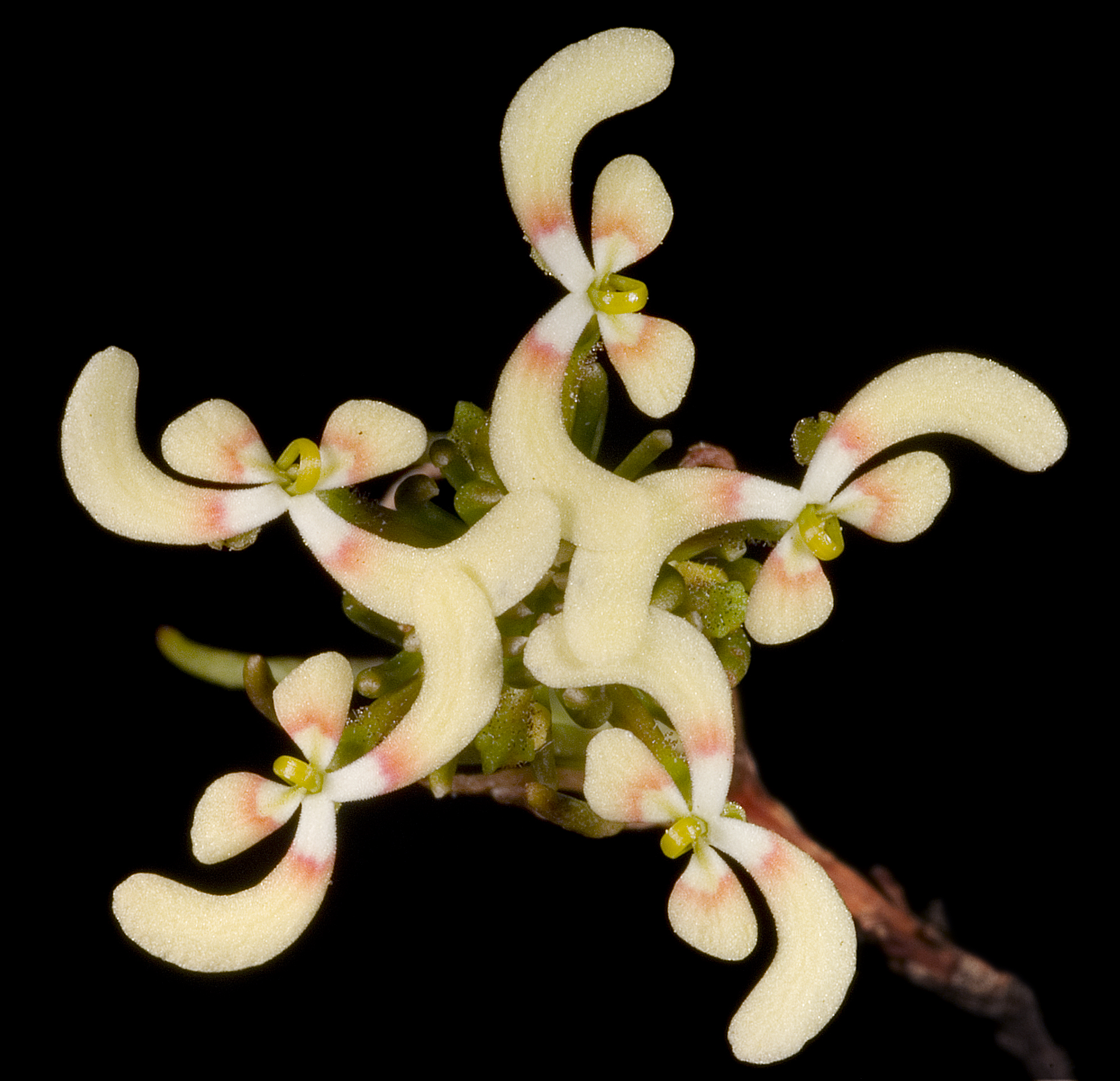

Scientific classification
- Kingdom: Plantae
- Clade: Tracheophytes
- Clade: Angiosperms
- Clade: Eudicots
- Clade: Asterids
- Order: Asterales
- Family: Stylidiaceae
- Subfamily: Stylidioideae
- Genus: Stylidium
- Species: S. breviscapum

Binomial name
- Stylidium breviscapum R.Br.

Synonyms
- Candollea breviscapa F.Muell.; Stylidium eriopodum DC.

= Stylidium breviscapum =

Species of herb

Stylidium breviscapum is a dicotyledonous species of plant in the family Stylidiaceae. It grows as a creeping perennial herb which forms in compact clumps to 15 cm wide. Only found in the south west corner of Western Australia. The preferred habitat is eucalyptus woodland or shrublands. Attractive colourful flowers appear in October and November. This species first appeared in scientific literature in 1839, in the Prodromus Systematis Naturalis Regni Vegetabilis published by the Swiss botanist Augustin Pyramus de Candolle.

== See also ==
- List of Stylidium species
