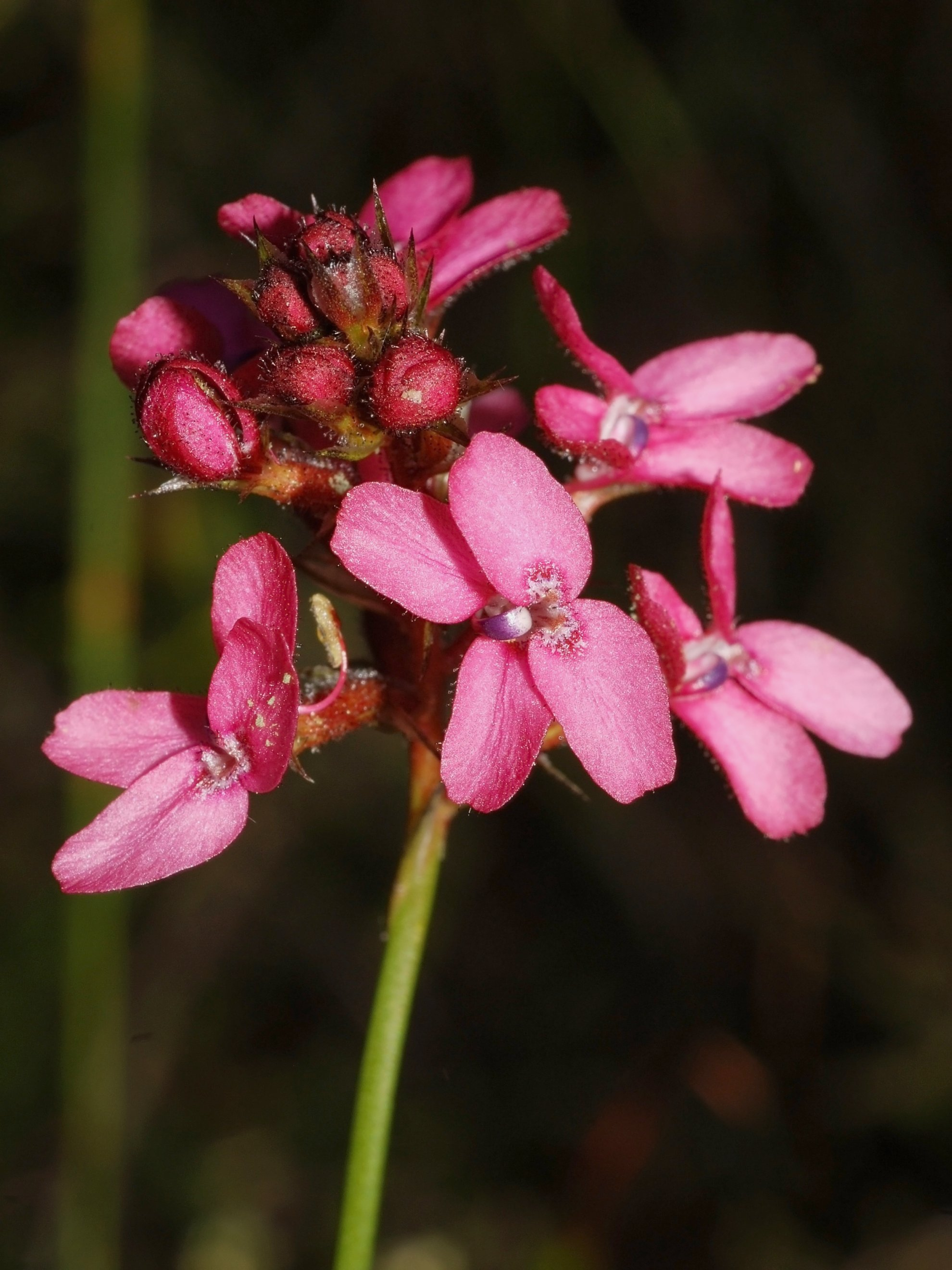
- Flowers of Stylidium squamosotuberosum

Scientific classification
- Kingdom: Plantae
- Clade: Tracheophytes
- Clade: Angiosperms
- Clade: Eudicots
- Clade: Asterids
- Order: Asterales
- Family: Stylidiaceae
- Genus: Stylidium
- Species: S. squamosotuberosum

Binomial name
- Stylidium squamosotuberosum Carlquist

= Stylidium squamosotuberosum =

Species of flowering plant

Stylidium squamosotuberosum is a species of plant in the genus Stylidium (also known as trigger plants). It was described in 1969 by Sherwin Carlquist. Discovered in 1969.

== Distribution ==
This species of plant is most common in Western Australia, found in Perth, Wardandi, Pibelmenm, Minang, Koreng and Kaneang and less common in Northern Territory of Australia.
