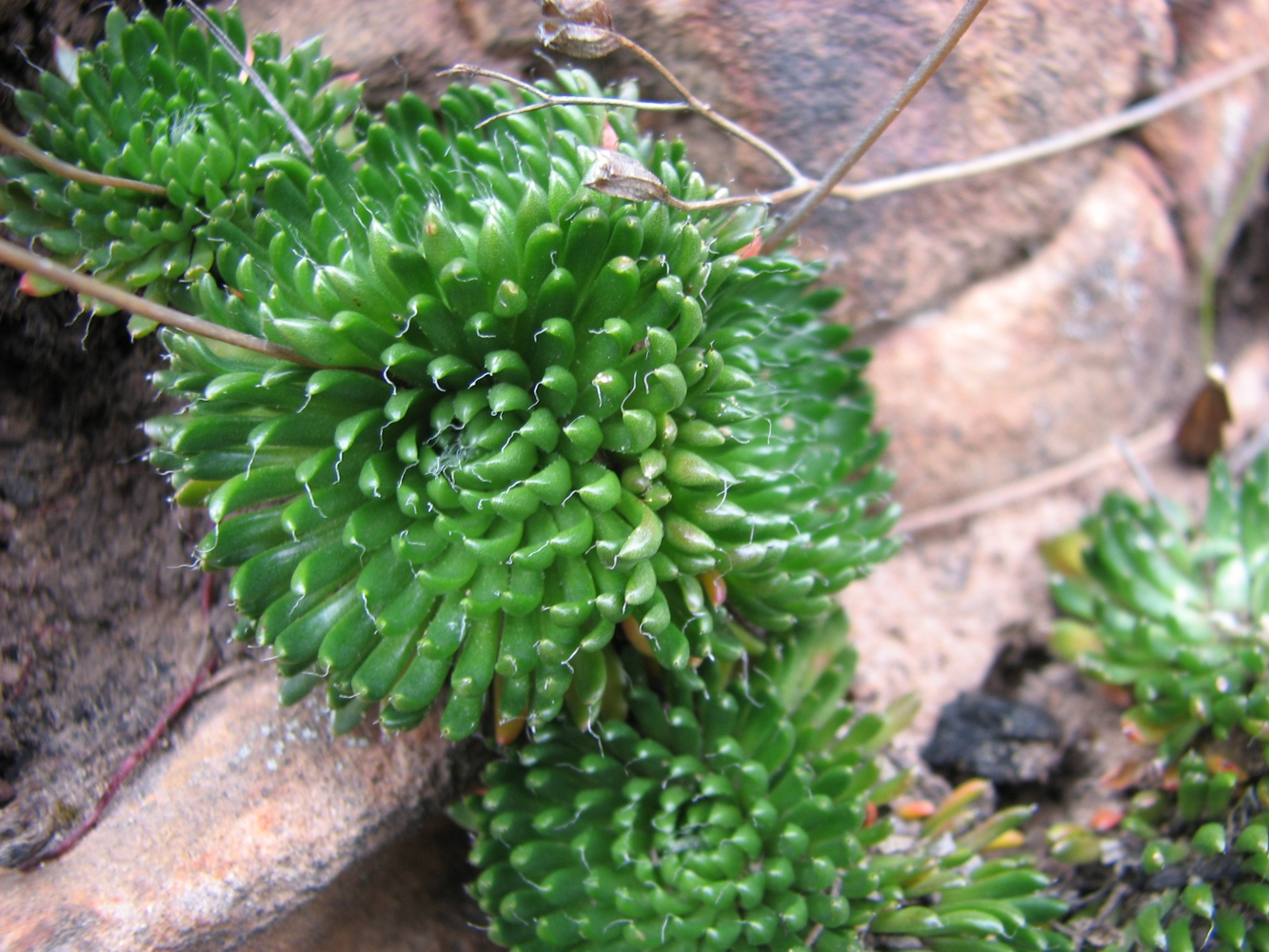
- Stylidium soboliferum in the Grampians National Park

Scientific classification
- Kingdom: Plantae
- Clade: Tracheophytes
- Clade: Angiosperms
- Clade: Eudicots
- Clade: Asterids
- Order: Asterales
- Family: Stylidiaceae
- Genus: Stylidium
- Subgenus: Stylidium subg. Tolypangium
- Section: Stylidium sect. Lineares
- Species: S. soboliferum

Binomial name
- Stylidium soboliferum F.Muell.

Synonyms
- Candollea sobolifera (F.Muell.) F.Muell.

= Stylidium soboliferum =

Species of carnivorous plant

Stylidium soboliferum, commonly known as Grampians triggerplant or bristly triggerplant, is a species of flowering plant in the family Stylidiaceae. It is endemic to the Grampians region in Victoria, Australia. The leaves are about 1–2 centimetres (0.39–0.79 in) long and are arranged in a small rosette. The flowers, which appear on 5–15 centimetres (2.0–5.9 in) long stems, have white to pale pink petals with a darker colour on the reverse side. Plants occur along drainage lines and in moist areas amongst rocks.

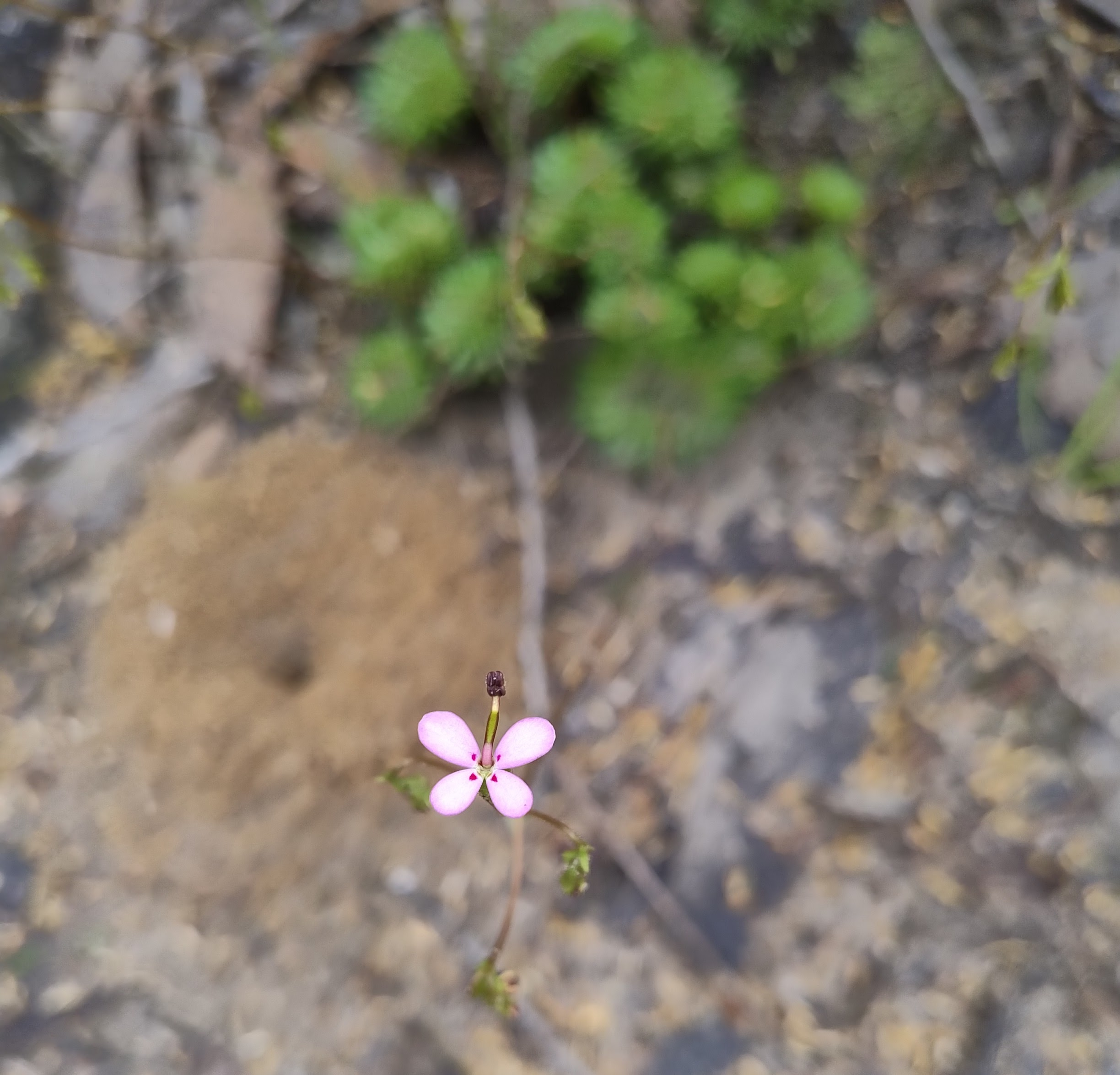
Flower of Stylidium soboliferum

Stylidium soboliferum is listed as "Rare in Victoria" on the Department of Sustainability and Environment's Advisory List of Rare Or Threatened Plants In Victoria.

== See also ==
- List of Stylidium species
