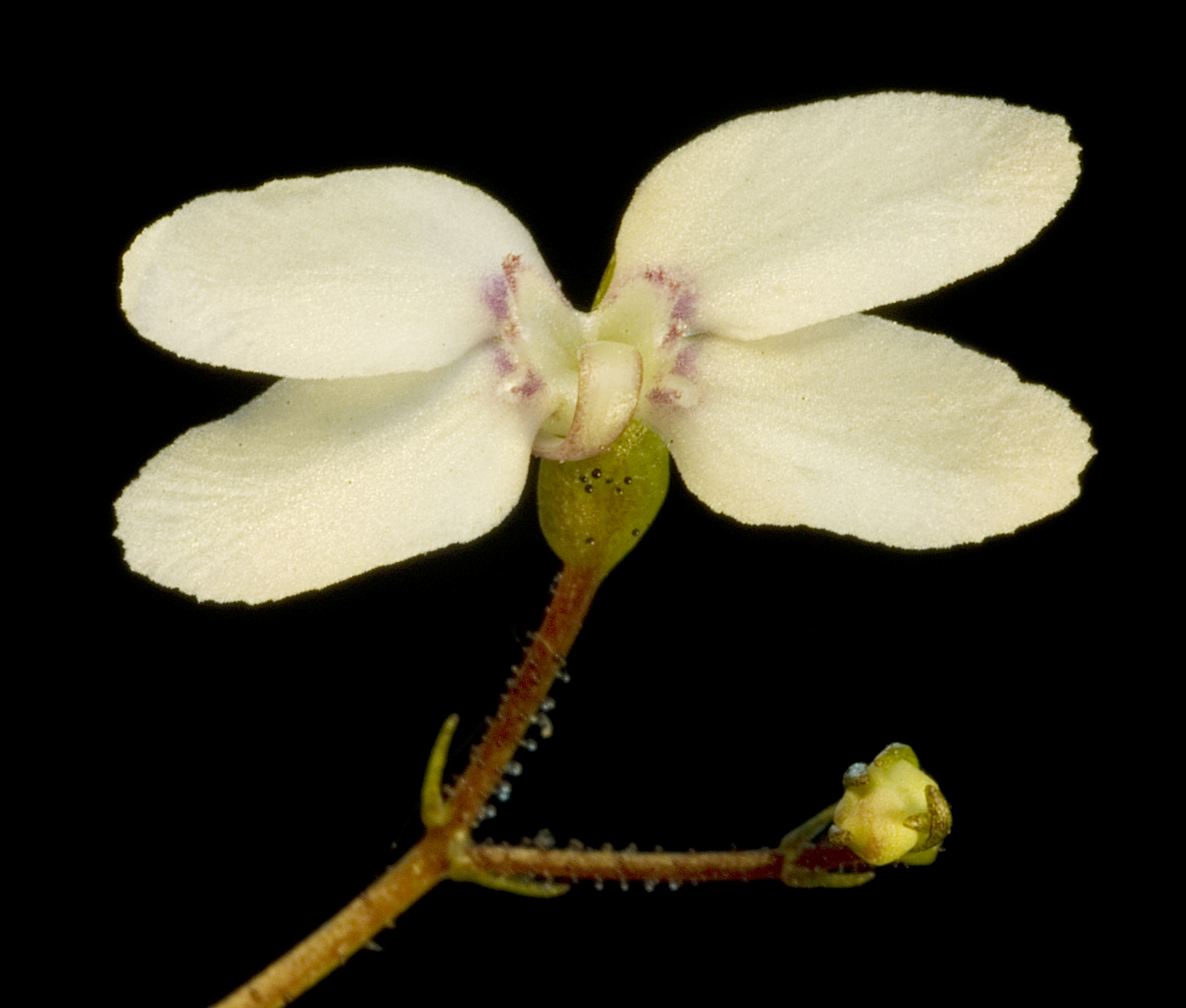

Conservation status
- Priority One — Poorly Known Taxa (DEC)

Scientific classification
- Kingdom: Plantae
- Clade: Tracheophytes
- Clade: Angiosperms
- Clade: Eudicots
- Clade: Asterids
- Order: Asterales
- Family: Stylidiaceae
- Genus: Stylidium
- Subgenus: Stylidium subg. Tolypangium
- Section: Stylidium sect. Saxifragoidea
- Species: S. perplexum

Binomial name
- Stylidium perplexum Wege

= Stylidium perplexum =

Species of carnivorous plant

Stylidium perplexum is a species of triggerplant that is endemic to south-west Western Australia. It is a tuberous species that has many stems and has been described as "somewhat shrubby" at 15–40 cm tall. The linear leaves can be 2 cm long and are arranged around the stem in a rosette at the stem apices. The 8–19 cm tall scapes bear 6 to 14 flowers that are white with purple accents and corolla lobes that are laterally paired and 4–6 mm long.

S. perplexum was first collected by Graham S. McCutcheon in 1983, but was initially identified as S. fasciculatum. Juliet Wege discovered the specimen at the Western Australian Herbarium (PERTH) and then relocated McCutcheon's original collection site in November 2007. The only known location of this species is on the Whicher Scarp, near Dardanup. It grows in lateritic soils among Eucalyptus marginata and Corymbia haematoxylon woodlands. It flowers in November and December.

Wege published the formal description of this species in August 2008.
