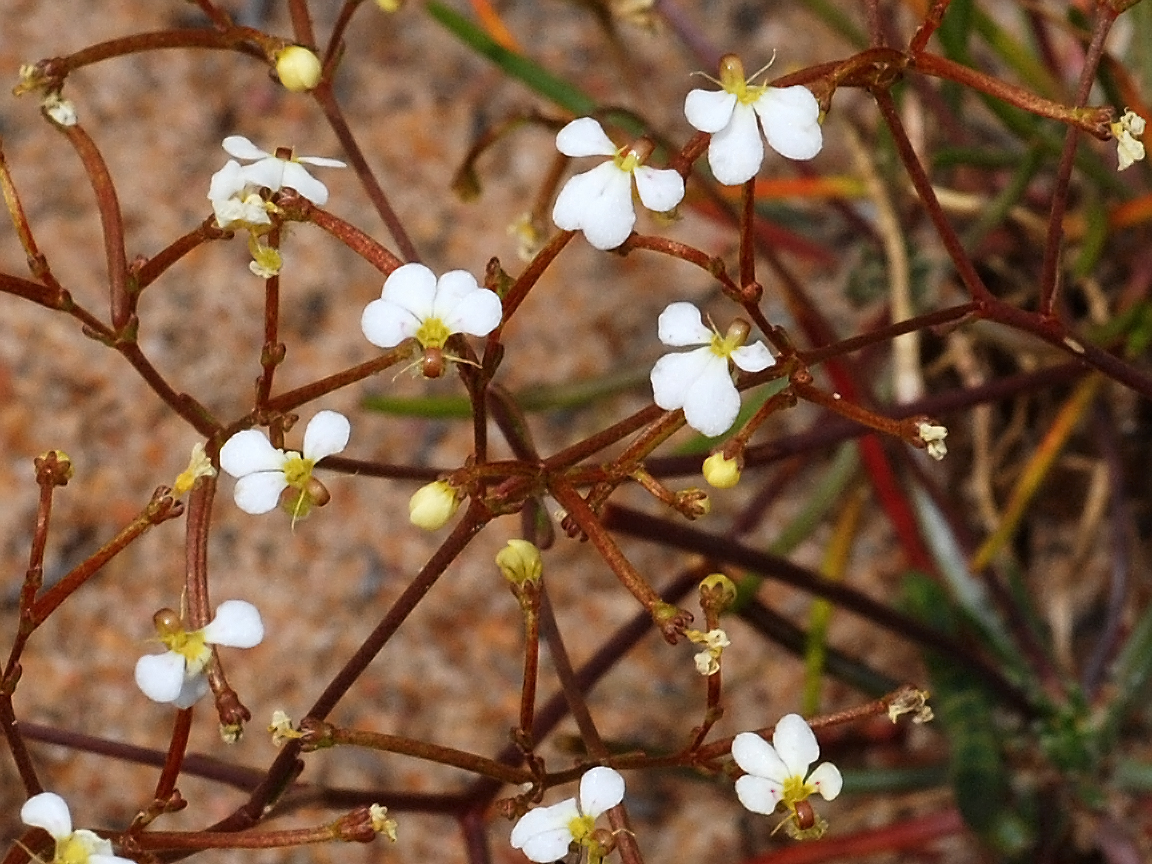

Scientific classification
- Kingdom: Plantae
- Clade: Tracheophytes
- Clade: Angiosperms
- Clade: Eudicots
- Clade: Asterids
- Order: Asterales
- Family: Stylidiaceae
- Genus: Stylidium
- Subgenus: Stylidium subg. Nitrangium
- Section: Stylidium sect. Sonderella
- Species: S. divaricatum

Binomial name
- Stylidium divaricatum Sond.

= Stylidium divaricatum =

Species of plant

Stylidium divaricatum, known by the vernacular name daddy-long-legs, is a species in the genus Stylidium that is endemic to Western Australia.

It was first described by the German botanist Otto Wilhelm Sonder in 1845.

== See also ==
- List of Stylidium species
