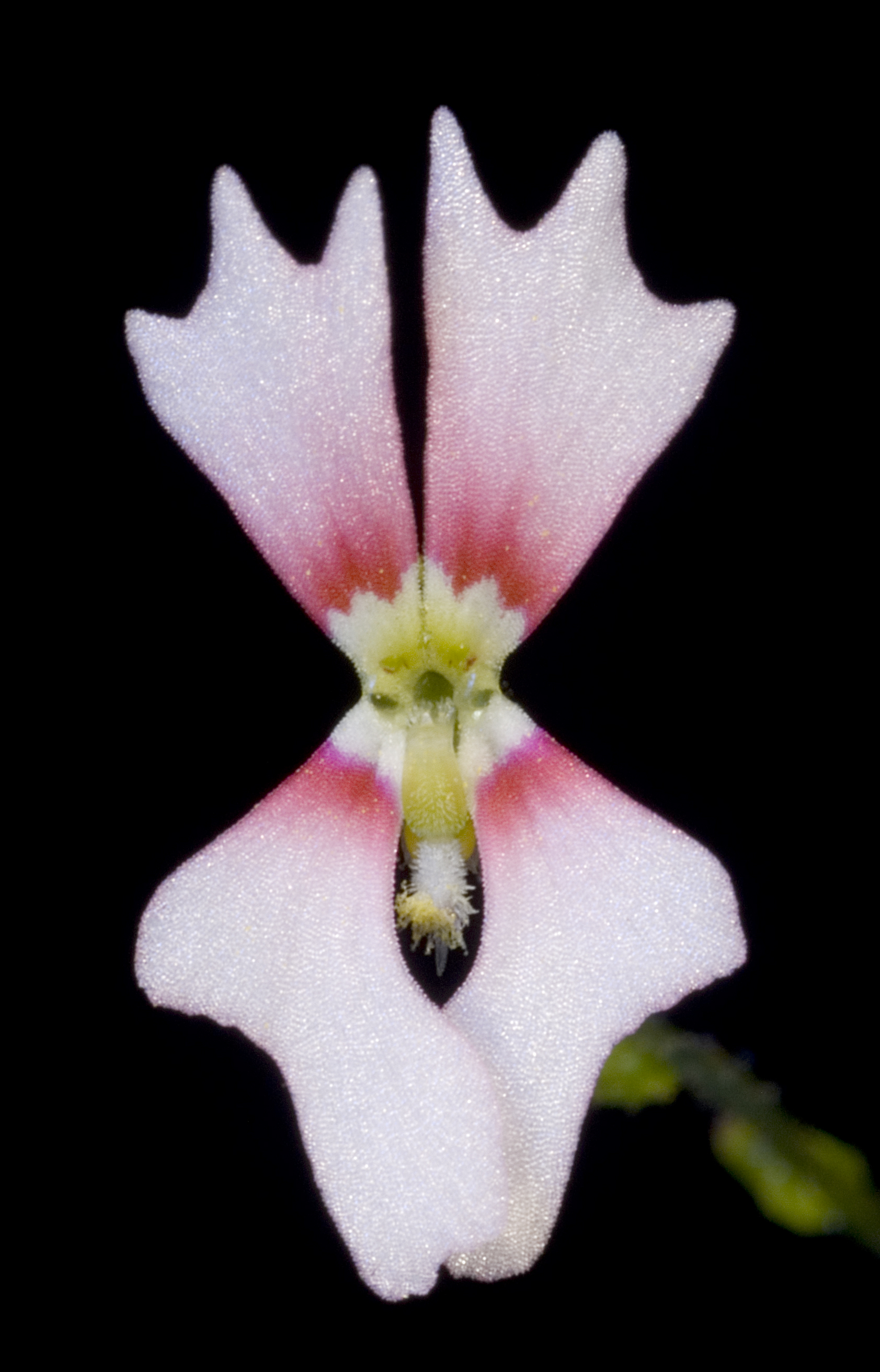

Scientific classification
- Kingdom: Plantae
- Clade: Tracheophytes
- Clade: Angiosperms
- Clade: Eudicots
- Clade: Asterids
- Order: Asterales
- Family: Stylidiaceae
- Subfamily: Stylidioideae
- Genus: Stylidium
- Species: S. androsaceum

Binomial name
- Stylidium androsaceum Lindl.

= Stylidium androsaceum =

Species of carnivorous plant

Stylidium androsaceum is a dicotyledonous species of plant in the family Stylidiaceae. It is native to subtropical regions of Australia (South Australia, Victoria, and Western Australia).

It is not to be confused with the taxon described by O.Schwarz Stylidium ericksoniae, or the taxon described by DC. Stylidium guttatum.

== See also ==
- List of Stylidium species
