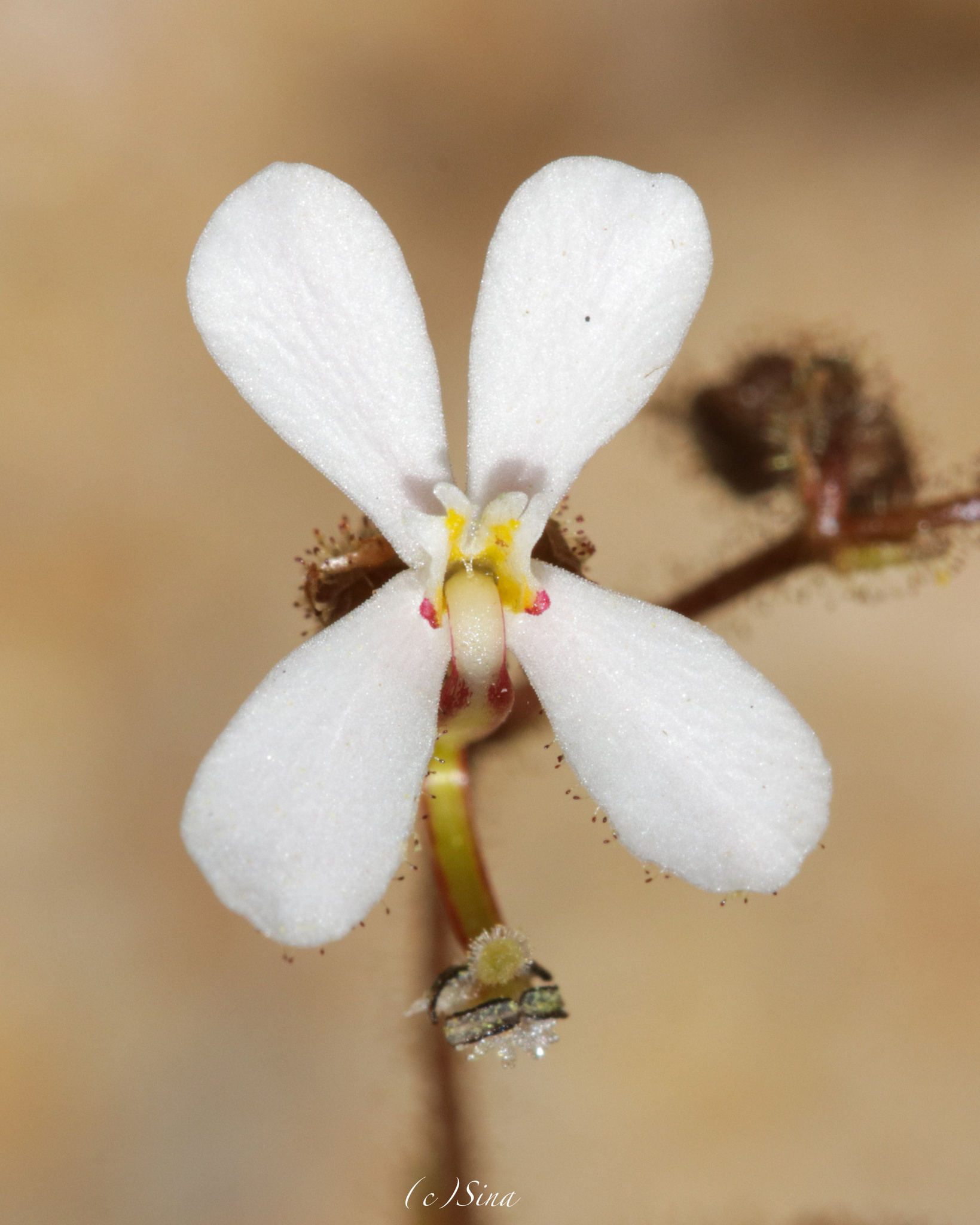

Scientific classification
- Kingdom: Plantae
- Clade: Tracheophytes
- Clade: Angiosperms
- Clade: Eudicots
- Clade: Asterids
- Order: Asterales
- Family: Stylidiaceae
- Genus: Stylidium
- Species: S. arenicola

Binomial name
- Stylidium arenicola Carlquist

= Stylidium arenicola =

Species of flowering plant

Stylidium arenicola is a species of dicotyledon plant in the genus Stylidium (also known as trigger plants). It was described in 1969 by Sherwin Carlquist.

== Distribution ==
The species is endemic to Western Australia, where it is mostly found in Wiluna and in Kalgoorlie.
