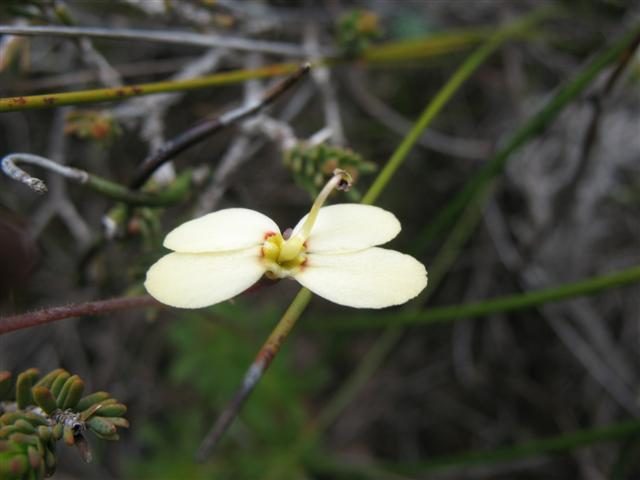

Scientific classification
- Kingdom: Plantae
- Clade: Tracheophytes
- Clade: Angiosperms
- Clade: Eudicots
- Clade: Asterids
- Order: Asterales
- Family: Stylidiaceae
- Genus: Stylidium
- Subgenus: Stylidium subg. Tolypangium
- Section: Stylidium sect. Saxifragoidea
- Species: S. rupestre

Binomial name
- Stylidium rupestre Sond. 1845

= Stylidium rupestre =

Species of carnivorous plant

Stylidium rupestre is a dicotyledonous plant that belongs to the genus Stylidium (family Stylidiaceae), a species sometimes named as the rock triggerplant. It is found in Southwest Australia. The species was first described by Otto Wilhelm Sonder.

== See also ==
- List of Stylidium species
