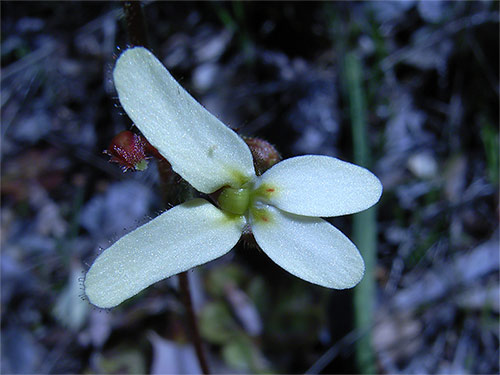

Scientific classification
- Kingdom: Plantae
- Clade: Tracheophytes
- Clade: Angiosperms
- Clade: Eudicots
- Clade: Asterids
- Order: Asterales
- Family: Stylidiaceae
- Genus: Stylidium
- Subgenus: Stylidium subg. Tolypangium
- Section: Stylidium sect. Lineares
- Species: S. hispidum

Binomial name
- Stylidium hispidum Lindl., 1839

= Stylidium hispidum =

Species of carnivorous plant

Stylidium hispidum, the white butterfly triggerplant, is a dicotyledonous plant that belongs to the genus Stylidium (family Stylidiaceae). S. hispidum is endemic to Australia and is found primarily in southwest Western Australia near Perth. This species is a basally rosetted triggerplant with greyish, linear leaves growing up to three cm. The scape is reddish, from six to thirty cm tall ending in a somewhat branched raceme giving rise to white or cream-colored flowers, which have red spots near the throat of the flower. The primary habitat for S. hispidum includes jarrah forests, gravelly loams, and light sandy soils.

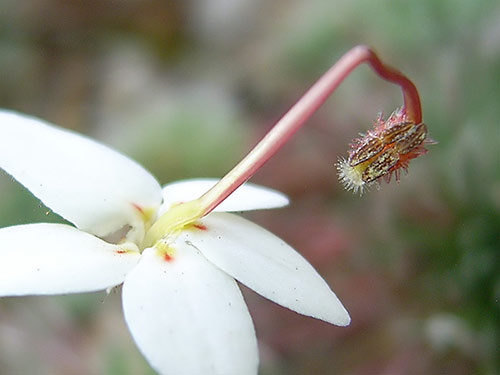
Unusual flower with five petals

== See also ==
- List of Stylidium species
