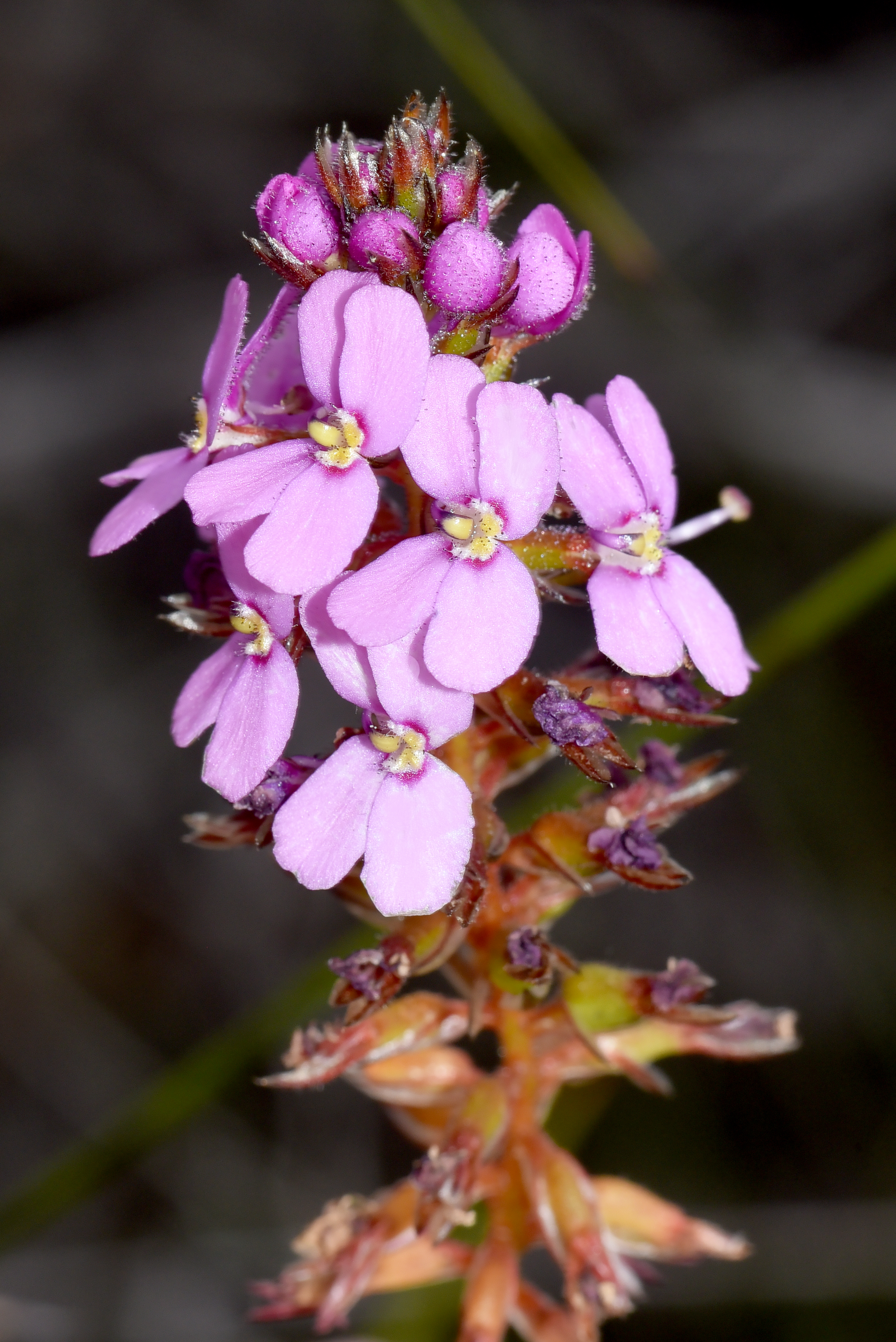

Scientific classification
- Kingdom: Plantae
- Clade: Tracheophytes
- Clade: Angiosperms
- Clade: Eudicots
- Clade: Asterids
- Order: Asterales
- Family: Stylidiaceae
- Genus: Stylidium
- Species: S. scariosum

Binomial name
- Stylidium scariosum DC.

= Stylidium scariosum =

Species of flowering plant

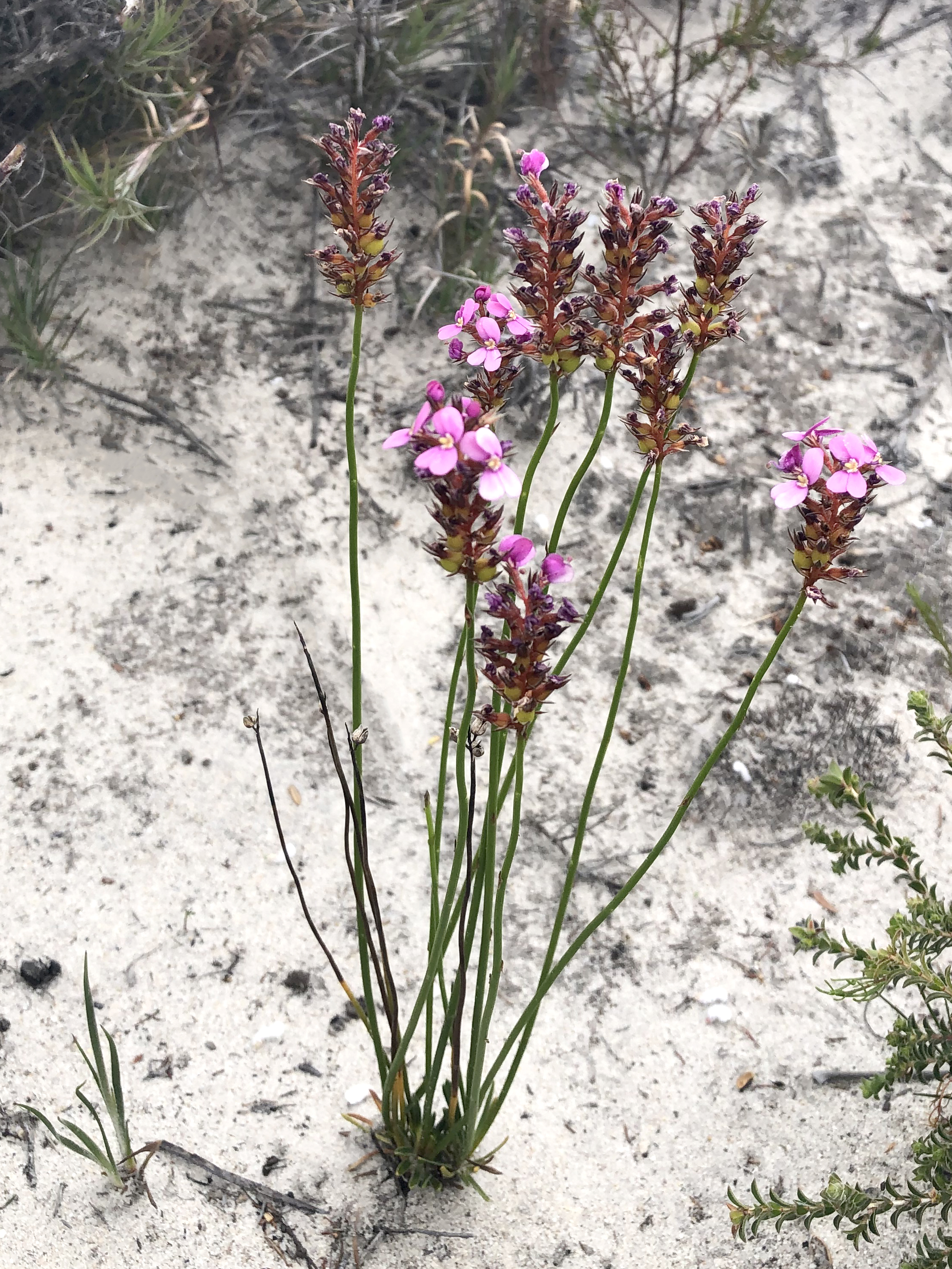
Badgingarra NP

Stylidium scariosum is a small plant species in the family Stylidiaceae. It is endemic to Western Australia.

The species was described in 1839 by Augustin Pyramus de Candolle.

It is found in the IBRA regions of Jarrah Forest, the Swan Coastal Plain and the Geraldton Sandplains.
