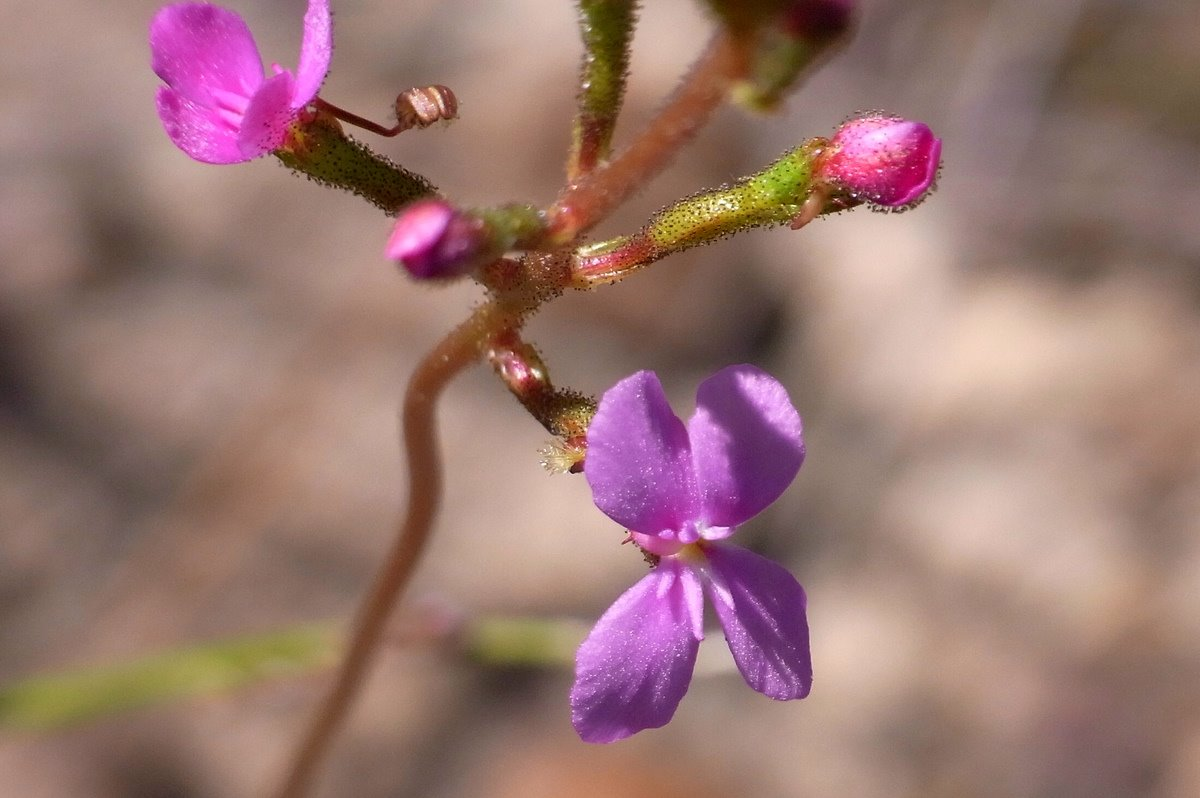
- Trigger plant at Ku-ring-gai Chase National Park, Australia

Scientific classification
- Kingdom: Plantae
- Clade: Tracheophytes
- Clade: Angiosperms
- Clade: Eudicots
- Clade: Asterids
- Order: Asterales
- Family: Stylidiaceae
- Genus: Stylidium
- Subgenus: Stylidium subg. Andersonia
- Section: Stylidium sect. Andersonia
- Species: S. productum

Binomial name
- Stylidium productum Hindmarsh & D. Blaxell

= Stylidium productum =

Species of plant

Stylidium productum is a small plant found in eastern Australia. Common in the Sydney region, it grows on soils derived from Hawkesbury sandstone.

Flowers appear in spring and summer, having five pink petals, but one is very small.

== Pollination ==
Stylidium productum features an unusual form of pollination.

The style and two anthers strike insects landing on the flower, which are then showered with pollen.
