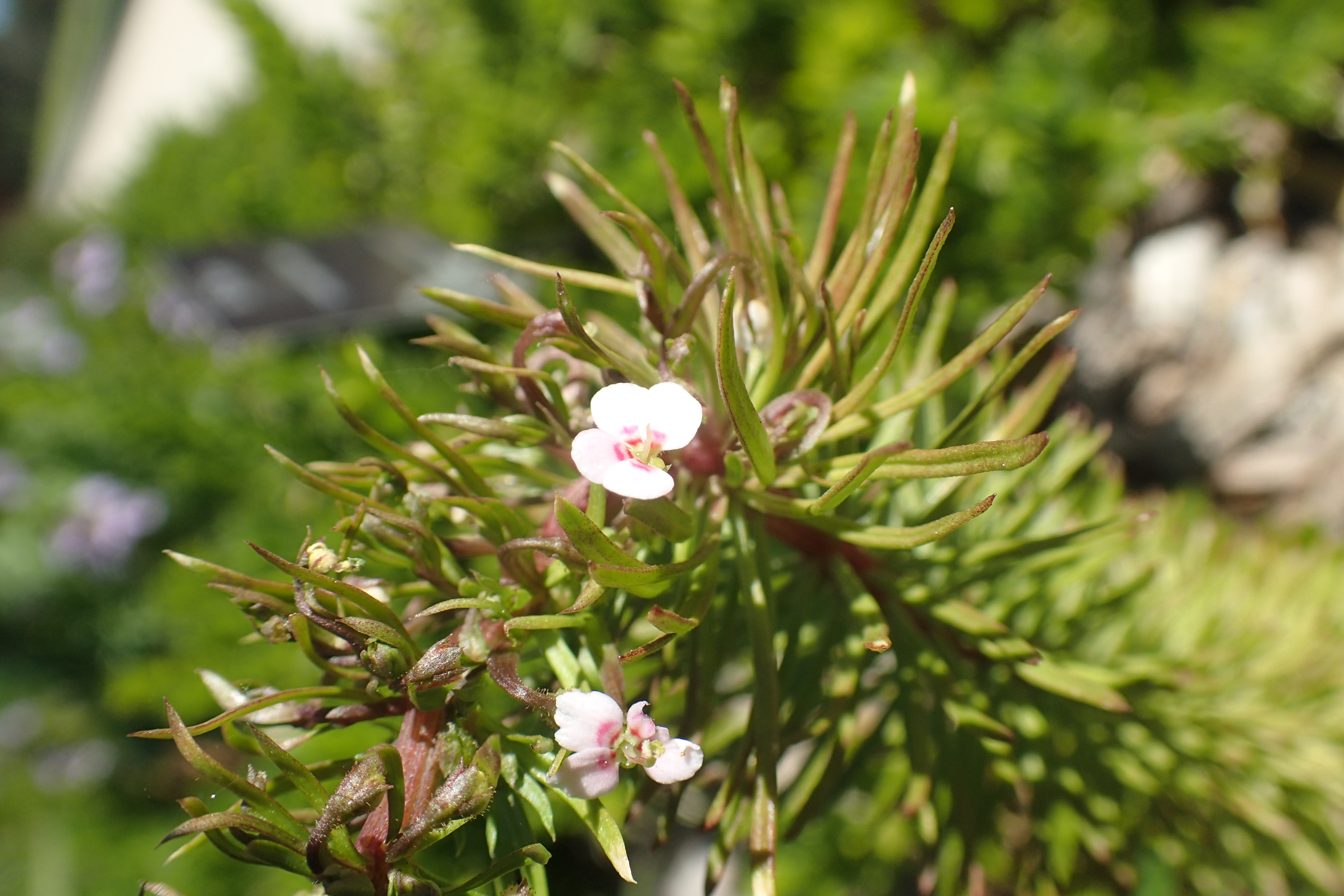
- Stylidium adnatum in Kings Park, Perth

Scientific classification
- Kingdom: Plantae
- Clade: Tracheophytes
- Clade: Angiosperms
- Clade: Eudicots
- Clade: Asterids
- Order: Asterales
- Family: Stylidiaceae
- Genus: Stylidium
- Species: S. adnatum

Binomial name
- Stylidium adnatum R.Br.

Synonyms
- Candollea adnata (R.Br.) F.Muell.; Candollea adnata var. abbreviata (Benth.) De Wild.; Candollea adnata (R.Br.) F.Muell. var. adnata; Stylidium adnatum var. abbreviatum Benth. nom. illeg., nom. superfl.; Stylidium adnatum R.Br. var. adnatum; Stylidium adnatum var. propinquum (R.Br.) R.Br.; Stylidium propinquum R.Br.

= Stylidium adnatum =

Common beaked trigger plant

Species of carnivorous plant

Stylidium adnatum, commonly known as the common beaked triggerplant, is a species of flowering plant in the family Stylidiaceae and is endemic to the southwest of Western Australia.

This species is leafy-stemmed and scrambling, growing up to 10 cm tall with leaves that are 3 cm long and 5 mm wide. It blooms in late winter and spring with small (3–4 mm wide) white flowers that bear red stripes. S. adnatum is primarily found in jarrah and karri forests, among reeds of paperbark swamps, and in heath by streams entering the ocean. S. adnatum is also commonly found in the wild, growing along cleared firebreaks in the Porongurup ranges, indicating that it is tolerant to ground disturbance. It has been cultivated by members of the W.A. Wildflower Society (a not-for-profit group) in Landsdale, where it can be purchased by the public. It is easily propagated by cuttings and is robust in culture, although it can suffer from sucking insects such as scale. It has been found to grow well as an indoor potted plant near a well-lit window with indirect or partial sun. Taken together, these two pieces of information indicate that it would make a good commercial houseplant, possibly capturing the sector of the market fascinated by touch-stimulated plants such as venus fly traps or mimosa.

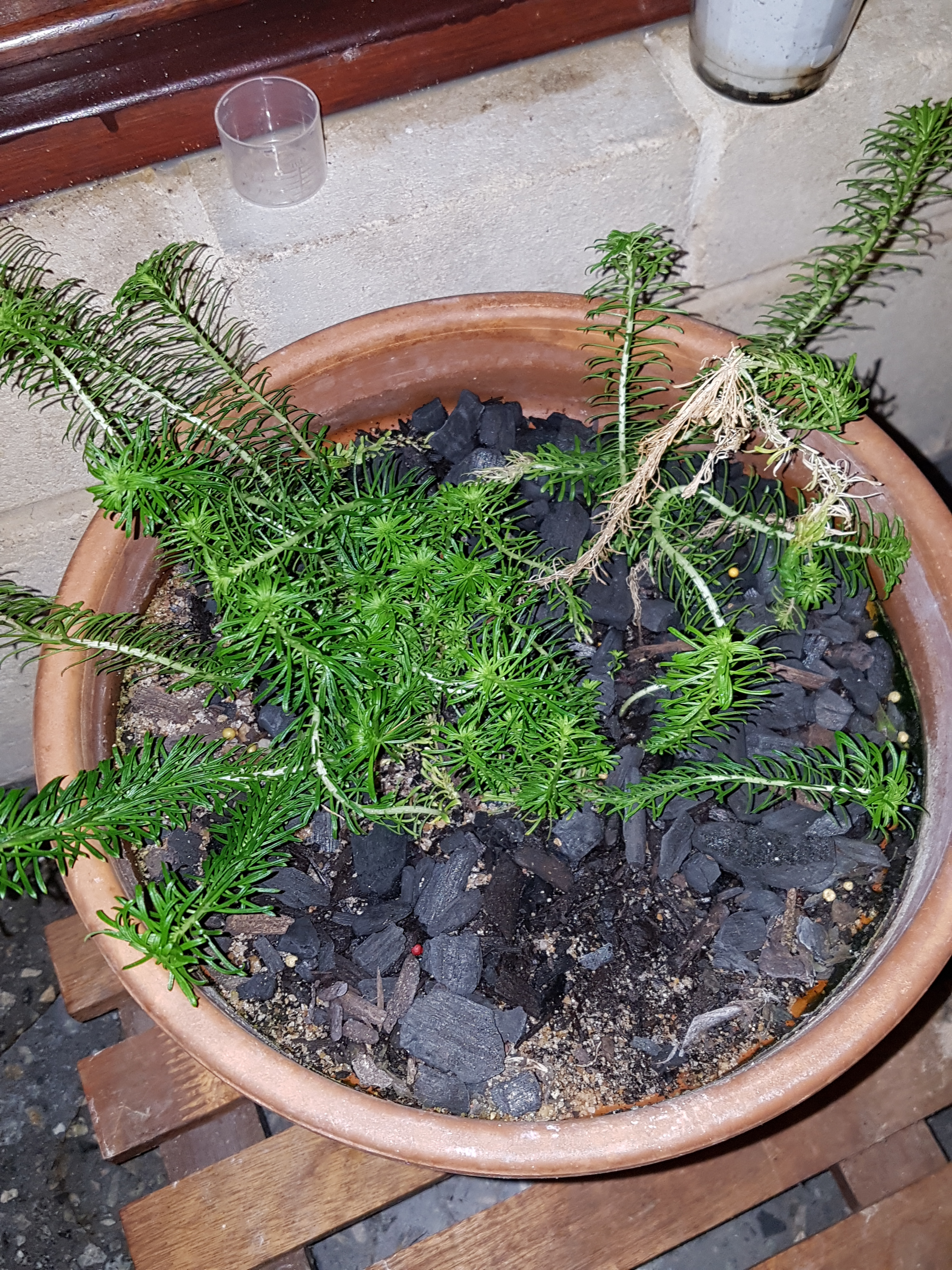
Stylidium adnatum growing indoors in a pot.

Stylidium adnatum var. abbreviatum (Benth., 1868) is a variety of this species found in wild populations and is noted for its short and dense inflorescence. The variety was discovered and named twice, the second being S. adnatum var. propinquum (R.Br.), though this name is no longer used.

== See also ==
- List of Stylidium species
