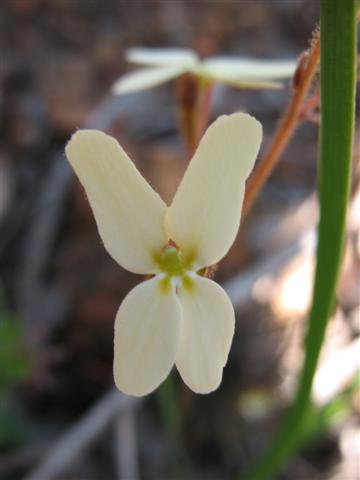

Scientific classification
- Kingdom: Plantae
- Clade: Tracheophytes
- Clade: Angiosperms
- Clade: Eudicots
- Clade: Asterids
- Order: Asterales
- Family: Stylidiaceae
- Genus: Stylidium
- Species: S. piliferum

Binomial name
- Stylidium piliferum R.Br.

= Stylidium piliferum =

Species of flowering plant

Stylidium piliferum is a species of dicotyledonous plant from the genus Stylidium. It is found in Western Australia.

== Subspecies ==
This species has only a subspecies:

- S. p. minor
- S. p. piliferum
