= Nuytsia (journal) =

Systematic botany journal from Western Australia

- Discipline: Botany
- Language: English

Publication details
- History: 1970-present
- Publisher: Western Australian Herbarium (Australia)
- Frequency: Irregular (Up to two issue per year)

Standard abbreviations
- ISO 4: Nuytsia

Indexing
- ISSN: 0085-4417 (print); 2200-2790 (web)

Links
- Journal homepage

Nuytsia is a peer-reviewed scientific journal published by the Western Australian Herbarium. It publishes papers on systematic botany, giving preference to papers related to the flora of Western Australia. Nearly twenty percent of Western Australia's plant taxa have been published in Nuytsia. The journal was established in 1970 and has appeared irregularly since. Kevin Thiele and Juliet Wege have been in the editorial committee .

Nuytsia is named after the monospecific genus Nuytsia, whose only species is Nuytsia floribunda, the Western Australian Christmas tree.

Occasionally, the journal has published special issues, such as an issue in 2007 substantially expanding described species from Western Australia. The 50th or Golden Anniversary edition was published online in January 2020. In the Wegel and Shepherd introduction to the edition, and the details of the history of the journal - mention of the plan for work in the 2018 - 2027 period is mentioned of Discovering biodiversity: a decadal taxonomy and biosystematics in Australia and New Zealand 2018-2027.

== Publication details ==
The record of the issues published is found at the FloraBase database.
