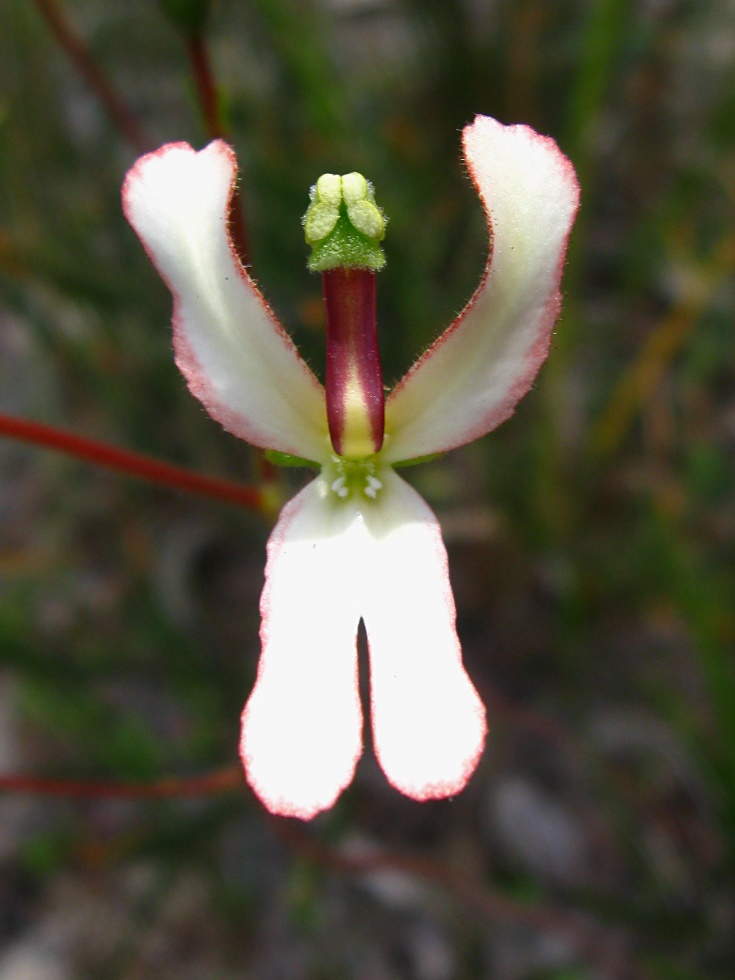

Scientific classification
- Kingdom: Plantae
- Clade: Tracheophytes
- Clade: Angiosperms
- Clade: Eudicots
- Clade: Asterids
- Order: Asterales
- Family: Stylidiaceae
- Genus: Stylidium
- Species: S. schoenoides

Binomial name
- Stylidium schoenoides DC.

= Stylidium schoenoides =

Species of flowering plant

Stylidium schoenoides is a species of dicotyledon plant of the Stylidium genus, from Stylidiaceae family, Asterales order, first described by Augustin Pyramus de Candolle in 1839. The plant is endemic to Western Australia.

== Description ==
Stylidium schoenoides is a perennial herb growing to a height from .15 to 0.5 m high. The leaves form a rosette and are 14–35 cm by 1-1.8 mm and hairless, though there are membraneous scale leaves present at base of mature leaves. The flower stalk has glandular hairs and long soft weak hairs. The white-cream flowers may be seen from August to November.

== Habitat ==
It grows on sand, sandy loam, and granite, on hillslopes, dunes, and plains, in forests, heaths, woodland and shrublands.
