= Juliet Wege =

Australian botanist

Juliet Ann Wege (born 1971 in Western Australia) is an Australian botanist. She graduated in 1992 and gained a PhD at The University of Western Australia in 1999 with a thesis titled "Morphological and anatomical variation within Stylidium (Stylidiaceae): a systematic perspective". As of 2021 she works as a researcher at the Western Australian Herbarium run by Western Australia's Department of Biodiversity, Conservation and Attractions and is managing editor of Nuytsia. Her main area of expertise is in taxonomy and study of the Stylidiaceae family of triggerplants.

During 2005 and 2006 she was the Australian Botanical Liaison Officer at the Royal Botanic Gardens in London, England.

On the 5th September 2026 Wege was appointed as the curator of the West Australian Herbarium, becoming the first women to hold position in its 97 year history.
