= Sherwin Carlquist =

American botanist (1930–2021)

Sherwin Carlquist FMLS
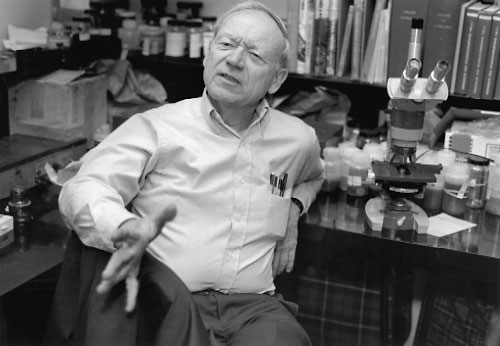
- Born: July 7, 1930
- Died: December 1, 2021 (aged 91)
- Education: University of California, Berkeley
- Awards: Linnean Medal (2002)
- Scientific career
- Fields: Botany
- Workplaces: Claremont Graduate School, Pomona College
- Author abbrev. (botany): Carlquist
- Website: Plant Discoveries : Sherwin Carlquist

Sherwin John Carlquist FMLS (July 7, 1930 - December 1, 2021) was an American botanist and photographer.

== Education ==
He received his undergraduate degree from the University of California, Berkeley in 1952 and a Ph.D. in botany in 1956, also at Berkeley. During his graduate studies, Marion Elizabeth Stilwell Cave instructed him in the nuances of plant microphotography and embryology. Carlquist did a postdoctoral study at Harvard University from 1955 to 1956.

== Career ==
After his postdoctoral studies, he began his teaching career at the Claremont Graduate School. In 1977 he also began teaching at Pomona College and continued teaching at both institutions until 1992. From 1984 to 1992 Carlquist was the resident Plant Anatomist at Rancho Santa Ana Botanic Garden. His last post was as an adjunct professor at University of California at Santa Barbara from 1993 to 1998.

Carlquist studied wood anatomy of the Gnetophyta and was an author of many plant taxa, including species of the carnivorous plant genus Drosera, the Western Australian genus Stylidium, and the odd Australian genus Alexgeorgea whose female flowers are almost entirely underground.

He has made important contributions to the field of island biology in the footstep of Alfred Russel Wallace, studying particularly Hawaiian Islands, introducing or emphasizing concepts such as island disharmony, loss of dispersal, increased woodiness, hybridization.

== Recognition ==
The California plant genus Carlquistia is named for Carlquist.

In 2006 he was awarded the Jose Cuatrecasas Medal for Excellence in Tropical Botany.

=== Plant species named after Carlquist ===
- Carlquistia muirii (Muir's tarplant)
