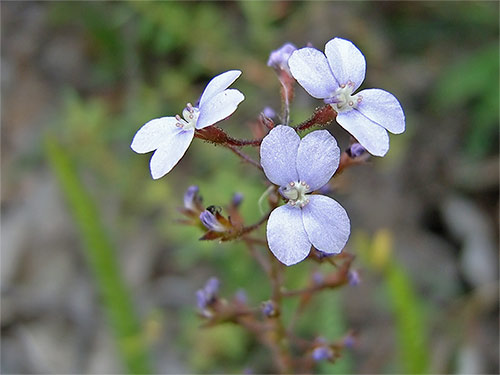
- Stylidium amoenum

Scientific classification
- Kingdom: Plantae
- Clade: Tracheophytes
- Clade: Angiosperms
- Clade: Eudicots
- Clade: Asterids
- Order: Asterales
- Family: Stylidiaceae; R.Br.

Genera
- Donatia; Forstera; Levenhookia; Oreostylidium; Phyllachne; Stylidium

Synonyms
- Candolleaceae F.Muell.

= Stylidiaceae =

Family of flowering plants

The family Stylidiaceae is a taxon of dicotyledonous flowering plants. It consists of five genera with over 240 species, most of which are endemic to Australia and New Zealand. Members of Stylidiaceae are typically grass-like herbs or small shrubs and can be perennials or annuals. Most species are free standing or self-supporting, though a few can be climbing or scrambling (Stylidium scandens uses leaf tips recurved into hooks to climb).

The pollination mechanisms of Stylidium and Levenhookia are as follows: In Stylidium the floral column, which consists of the fused stamen and style, springs violently from one side (usually under the flower) when triggered. This deposits the pollen on a visiting insect. In Levenhookia, however, the column is immobile, but the hooded labellum is triggered and sheds pollen.

In 1981, only about 155 species were known in the family. The current number of species by genus (reported in 2002) is as follows: Forstera - 5, Levenhookia - 10, Oreostylidium - 1, Phyllachne - 4, and Stylidium - 221. These numbers, especially for Stylidium, are changing rapidly as new species are described.

Stylidium rotundifolium appeared in Joseph Banks' Florilegium (plate 173), drawn from a specimen collected at Endeavour River, Australia in 1770.

== Taxonomy ==
The genus Donatia is sometimes included in Stylidiaceae in the monogeneric subfamily Donatioideae. The APG II system recommends its inclusion in Stylidiaceae but allows for the optional recognition of the family Donatiaceae. Molecular and phylogenetic analysis have determined that Donatia is a sister-group to Stylidiaceae and therefore placing Donatia in its own family has been recommended by several authorities. Including Donatia within the Stylidiaceae would endanger its status as a monophyletic group.

Donatioideae and Stylidioideae were described by Johannes Mildbraed in his 1908 taxonomic monograph of the family. The subfamilies were created to distinguish the difference between the five typical genera of the Stylidiaceae from the single genus Donatia, which Mildbraed placed in Donatioideae. The subfamily taxonomy represents the taxonomic uncertainty of Donatia, which has often been placed in its own family, Donatiaceae, or other families such as the Saxifragaceae.

Mildbraed's classification also included two tribes: Phyllachneae, which included the genera Forstera and Phyllachne, and Stylidieae, which included Levenhookia, Oreostylidium, and Stylidium. This level of infraspecific taxonomy is not used in recent research, but the groupings are supported by molecular data that suggest Forstera and Phyllachne are closely related but distinct from the other three.

APG II places Stylidiaceae and Donatiaceae in the Asterales. The Cronquist system placed both families in the Campanulales. The Takhtajan and Reveal systems place both families in the order Stylidiales. The Dahlgren system uses the same Stylidiales order, but it omits Donatiaceae. The Thorne system shifts Stylidiaceae into the Saxifragales order.
