= Stylidium darwinii =

Scientific classification
- Kingdom: Plantae
- Clade: Tracheophytes
- Clade: Angiosperms
- Clade: Eudicots
- Clade: Asterids
- Order: Asterales
- Family: Stylidiaceae
- Genus: Stylidium
- Subgenus: Stylidium subg. Andersonia
- Species: S. darwinii

Binomial name
- Stylidium darwinii Punekar & Lakshmin.

Species of carnivorous plant

Stylidium darwinii is a small, erect annual plant that belongs to the genus Stylidium (family Stylidiaceae). It grows up to 4.5 cm (1.8 in) tall. Elliptic-oblong or obovate to orbicular leaves are scattered and alternate along the simple, glabrous stem. The leaves are generally 2–3 mm long and 1.5-1.8 mm wide. Inflorescences produce many violet-pink flowers, which flower from September to November. Stylidium darwinii is only known from Anshi National Park in the Uttara Kannada district of Karnataka, India. Its habitat is recorded as being moist gravelly soils on the outskirts of evergreen forests near roadsides at an altitude of 530 m (1,739 ft). It can be found in association with several carnivorous plant species, including Drosera burmanni, Drosera indica, and Utricularia caerulea. The specific epithet darwinii was given to this species in honor of Charles Darwin.

This species was first located in 2007 as part of a floristic survey of Anshi National Park and was first formally described by Sachin A. Punekar and P. Lakshminarasimhan in 2010. It was placed in subgenus Andersonia, but the authors did not identify a section. They did, however, note that S. darwinii is closely allied with S. kunthii, S. inconspicuum, and S. tenellum.

== See also ==
- List of Stylidium species
