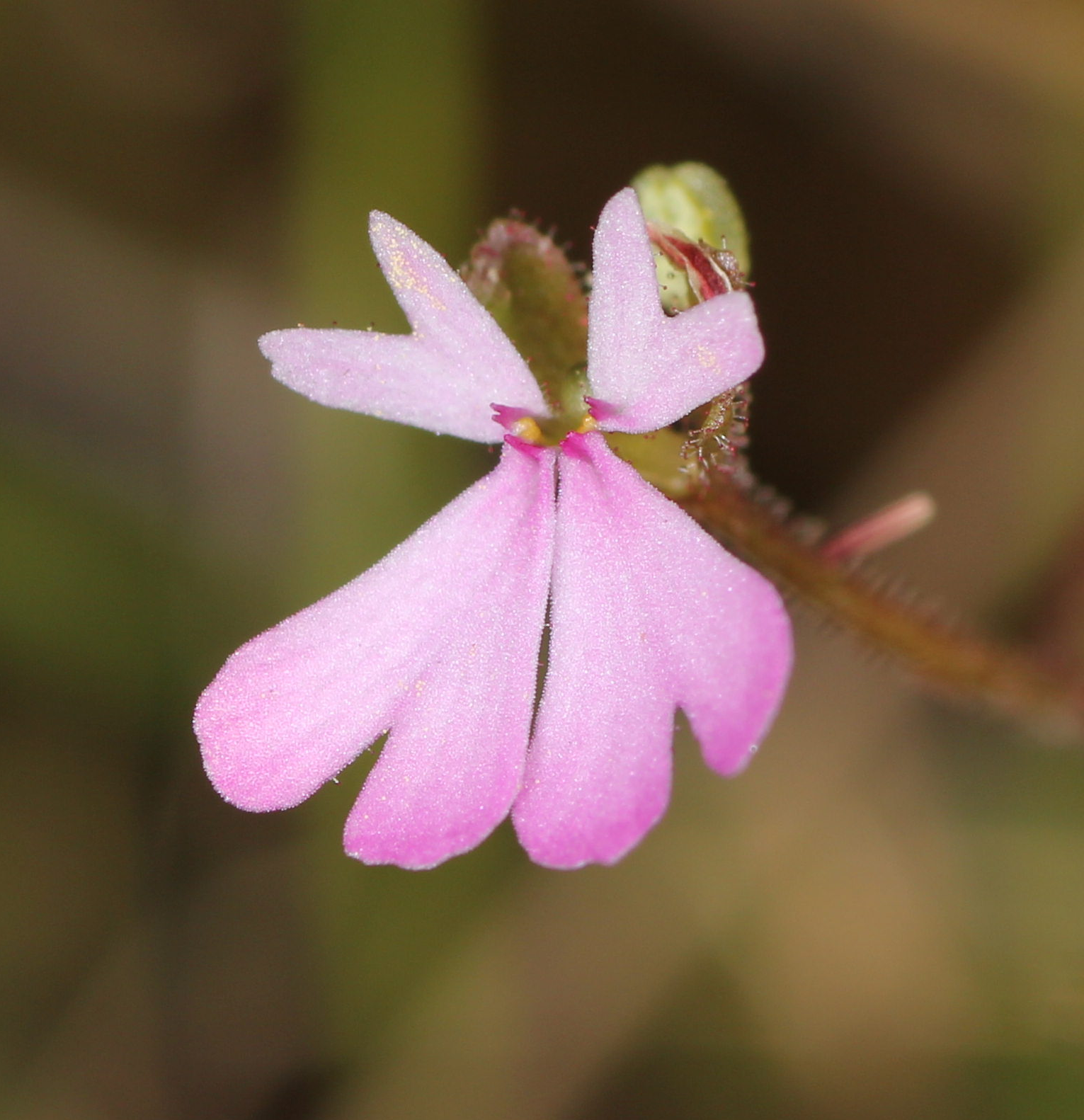

Scientific classification
- Kingdom: Plantae
- Clade: Tracheophytes
- Clade: Angiosperms
- Clade: Eudicots
- Clade: Asterids
- Order: Asterales
- Family: Stylidiaceae
- Genus: Stylidium
- Subgenus: Stylidium subg. Andersonia
- Section: Stylidium sect. Andersonia
- Species: S. ensatum

Binomial name
- Stylidium ensatum A.R.Bean

= Stylidium ensatum =

Species of carnivorous plant

Stylidium ensatum is a dicotyledonous plant that belongs to the genus Stylidium (family Stylidiaceae) that was described as a new species by A.R. Bean in 2000, though the taxon had been noted by Rica Erickson in her discussion of S. muscicola variation in 1958. The specific epithet ensatum is from the Latin ensatus, meaning sword-like, which refers to the shape of the floral throat appendages of this species.

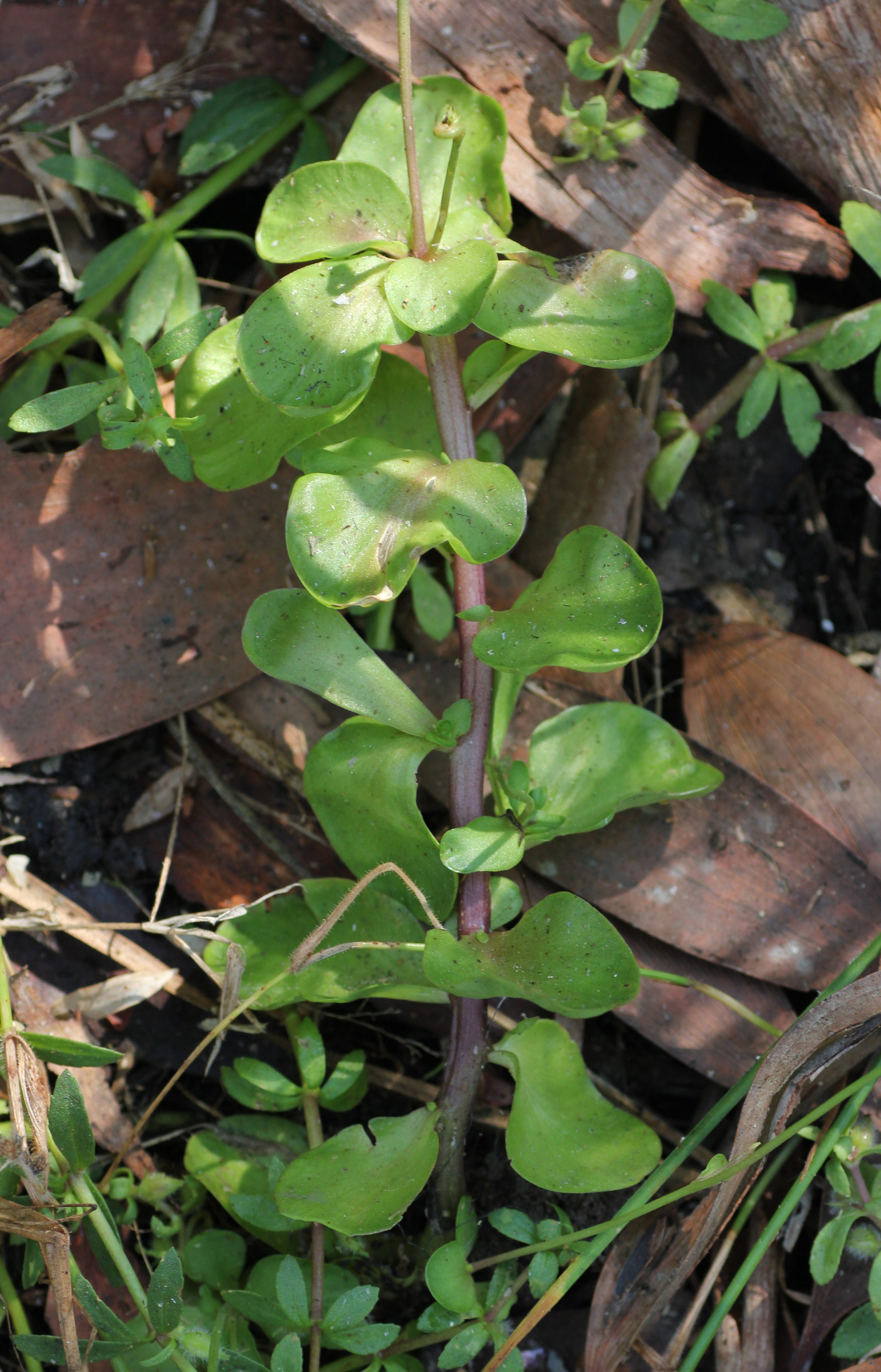
Stylidium ensatum at Gunn Point, Northern Territory, NT Herbarium

It is an erect annual plant that grows from 14 to 22 cm tall. Obovate or orbicular leaves, about 6-17 per plant, are scattered along the stems. The leaves are generally 7–12 mm long, 5.5–12 mm wide, and lack petioles. This species generally has one to three scapes and cymose inflorescences that are 8–16 cm long. Flowers are pink or mauve.

S. ensatum is endemic to the area around Darwin in the Northern Territory of Australia. Its habitat has been reported as being a "Melaleuca viridiflora-Lophostemon lactifluus forest with damp peaty soil." It flowers in the Southern Hemisphere from June to July. S. ensatum is most closely related to S. muscicola. Its conservation status has been assessed as data deficient.

== See also ==
- List of Stylidium species
