= Stylidium longissimum =

Conservation status
- Vulnerable (NCA)

Scientific classification
- Kingdom: Plantae
- Clade: Tracheophytes
- Clade: Angiosperms
- Clade: Eudicots
- Clade: Asterids
- Order: Asterales
- Family: Stylidiaceae
- Genus: Stylidium
- Subgenus: Stylidium subg. Andersonia
- Section: Stylidium sect. Tenella
- Species: S. longissimum

Binomial name
- Stylidium longissimum A.R.Bean 2000

Species of carnivorous plant

Stylidium longissimum is a dicotyledonous plant that belongs to the genus Stylidium (family Stylidiaceae). The specific epithet is from the Latin longissimus, which means "very long" and refers to this species' long capsules that can be up to 15 mm long excluding the sepals. The capsules may be the longest in the genus.

S. longissimum is an annual plant that grows from 16 to 30 cm tall. Elliptical leaves, about 4-14 per plant, are scattered along the elongate, glabrous stem. The leaves are generally 3.5-9.5 mm long and 1.8–5 mm wide. Petioles are nearly absent at 0–0.5 mm long and scapes are completely absent. Inflorescences are 5–20 cm long and produce pink or mauve flowers that bloom in June in the Southern Hemisphere. S. longissimum is endemic to the Cape Melville area of Cape York Peninsula in northern Queensland. The populations of S. longissimum inhabit an area of less than 30 km^{2} and the actual coverage is much less than that, which is why A.R. Bean recommended a conservation status of vulnerable when he described this species in 2000.

Its habitat is recorded as being sandy soils in Melaleuca viridiflora woodlands. S. longissimum is most closely related to S. inconspicuum.

== See also ==
- List of Stylidium species
