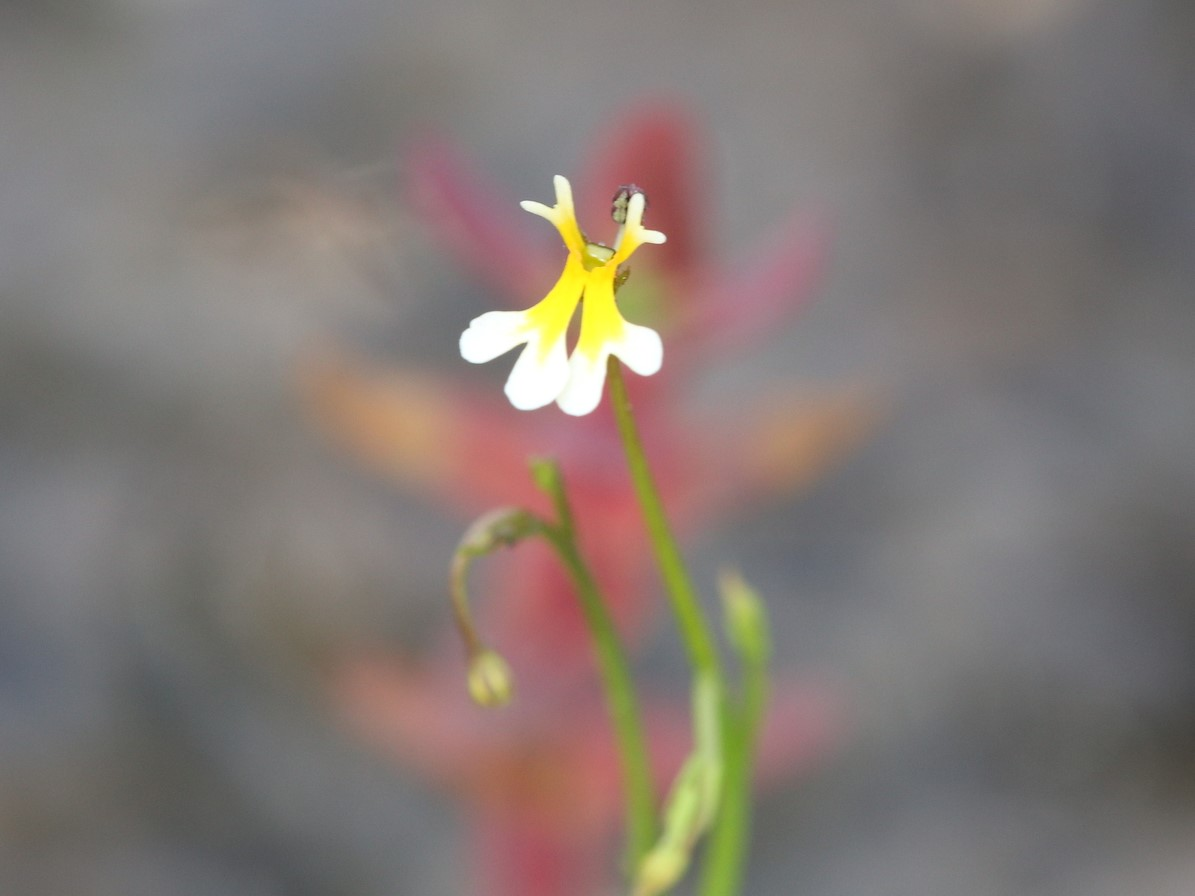

Scientific classification
- Kingdom: Plantae
- Clade: Tracheophytes
- Clade: Angiosperms
- Clade: Eudicots
- Clade: Asterids
- Order: Asterales
- Family: Stylidiaceae
- Genus: Stylidium
- Subgenus: Stylidium subg. Andersonia
- Section: Stylidium sect. Tenella
- Species: S. oviflorum

Binomial name
- Stylidium oviflorum A.R.Bean

= Stylidium oviflorum =

Species of carnivorous plant

Stylidium oviflorum is a dicotyledonous species of plant that belongs in the family Stylidiaceae.

== Taxonomy ==
According to Bean the specific epithet is derived from "the Latin ovi- egg and florus- flower, in reference to the corolla colour which combines rich yellow and pure white, just as in a fried hen’s egg".

== Description ==
It is an annual plant that grows from 6 to 26 cm tall. The linear or deltate leaves, about 3-11 per plant, are scattered along the stem and are generally 1.4–3 mm long and 0.25-0.6 mm wide. Petioles and scapes are absent. Inflorescences are 4–15 cm long and produce white and yellow flowers that bloom from April to August in the Southern Hemisphere. S. oviflorum is endemic to the northern area of Queensland from Mareeba and Wairuna west to Barwidgi. Its habitat is recorded as being sandy soils in seepage areas, on hillsides, or beside creeks in the company of Melaleuca viridiflora, Eucalyptus camaldulensis, or E. cullenii. S. oviflorum is most closely related to S. fissilobum but differs mostly in the corolla colour and self-supporting stems.

== Threats ==
Its conservation status has been assessed as data deficient.

== See also ==
- List of Stylidium species
