= Stylidium divergens =

Scientific classification
- Kingdom: Plantae
- Clade: Tracheophytes
- Clade: Angiosperms
- Clade: Eudicots
- Clade: Asterids
- Order: Asterales
- Family: Stylidiaceae
- Genus: Stylidium
- Subgenus: Stylidium subg. Andersonia
- Section: Stylidium sect. Andersonia
- Species: S. divergens

Binomial name
- Stylidium divergens A.R.Bean

Species of carnivorous plant

Stylidium divergens is a dicotyledonous plant that belongs to the genus Stylidium (family Stylidiaceae) and was described as a new species in 2000. The specific epithet divergens means diverging or separating, referring to the widely spreading posterior petals. It is an erect annual plant that grows from 7 to 27 cm tall. Obovate, orbicular, or elliptical leaves, about 2-6 per plant, form a basal rosette. The leaves are generally 4-21 mm long and 3-5 mm wide. This species generally has one to six scapes and cymose inflorescences that are 4-24 cm long. Flowers are white or mauve. S. divergens is endemic to Kakadu National Park in the Northern Territory of Australia. Its typical habitats are sandstone slopes and gullies. It flowers in the Southern Hemisphere in April. S. divergens is most closely related to S. accedens. Its conservation status has been assessed as data-deficient.

== See also ==
- List of Stylidium species
