= Stylidium prophyllum =

Conservation status
- Priority Three — Poorly Known Taxa (DEC)

Scientific classification
- Kingdom: Plantae
- Clade: Tracheophytes
- Clade: Angiosperms
- Clade: Eudicots
- Clade: Asterids
- Order: Asterales
- Family: Stylidiaceae
- Genus: Stylidium
- Subgenus: Stylidium subg. Andersonia
- Section: Stylidium sect. Tenella
- Species: S. prophyllum

Binomial name
- Stylidium prophyllum Lowrie & Kenneally 1997

Species of carnivorous plant

Stylidium prophyllum is a dicotyledonous plant that belongs to the genus Stylidium (family Stylidiaceae). It is an annual plant that grows from 8 to 30 cm (3.1 to 11.8 in) tall. The deltate leaves, about 4–10 per plant, are scattered along the elongate, glabrous stem and are generally 0.7–1.5 mm (0.028–0.059 in) long and 0.3–0.6 mm (0.012–0.024 in) wide. Petioles and scapes are absent. Inflorescences are 3–14 cm (1.2–5.5 in) long and produce pink flowers that bloom from February to June in the Southern Hemisphere. S. prophyllum is endemic to the area in and around the Kimberley region in Western Australia. Its habitat is recorded as being "grassy floodplains, seepage areas, and waterways." S. prophyllum is most closely related to S. fissilobum but differs mostly in its glabrous sepals.

== See also ==
- List of Stylidium species
