= Stylidium aquaticum =

Scientific classification
- Kingdom: Plantae
- Clade: Tracheophytes
- Clade: Angiosperms
- Clade: Eudicots
- Clade: Asterids
- Order: Asterales
- Family: Stylidiaceae
- Genus: Stylidium
- Subgenus: Stylidium subg. Andersonia
- Section: Stylidium sect. Tenella
- Species: S. aquaticum

Binomial name
- Stylidium aquaticum A.R.Bean

Species of carnivorous plant

Stylidium aquaticum is a dicotyledonous plant that belongs to the genus Stylidium (family Stylidiaceae). The specific epithet aquaticum refers to this species' typical habitat. It is an annual plant that grows from 18 to 30 cm tall. Linear leaves, about 20-100 per plant, are scattered along the elongate, glabrous stem. The leaves are generally 1.7–11 mm long and 0.1-0.3 mm wide. Petioles and scapes are absent. Inflorescences are 3–8 cm long. Flowers are pink or white. S. aquaticum is only known from its type location in northwestern Northern Territory of Australia. Its habitat is recorded as being a Melaleuca viridiflora swamp, growing in shallow water at a depth of around 7 cm. It flowers in the Southern Hemisphere in May. S. aquaticum is most closely related to S. fissilobum but differs mostly in the leaf shape. Its conservation status has been assessed as data deficient.

== See also ==
- List of Stylidium species
