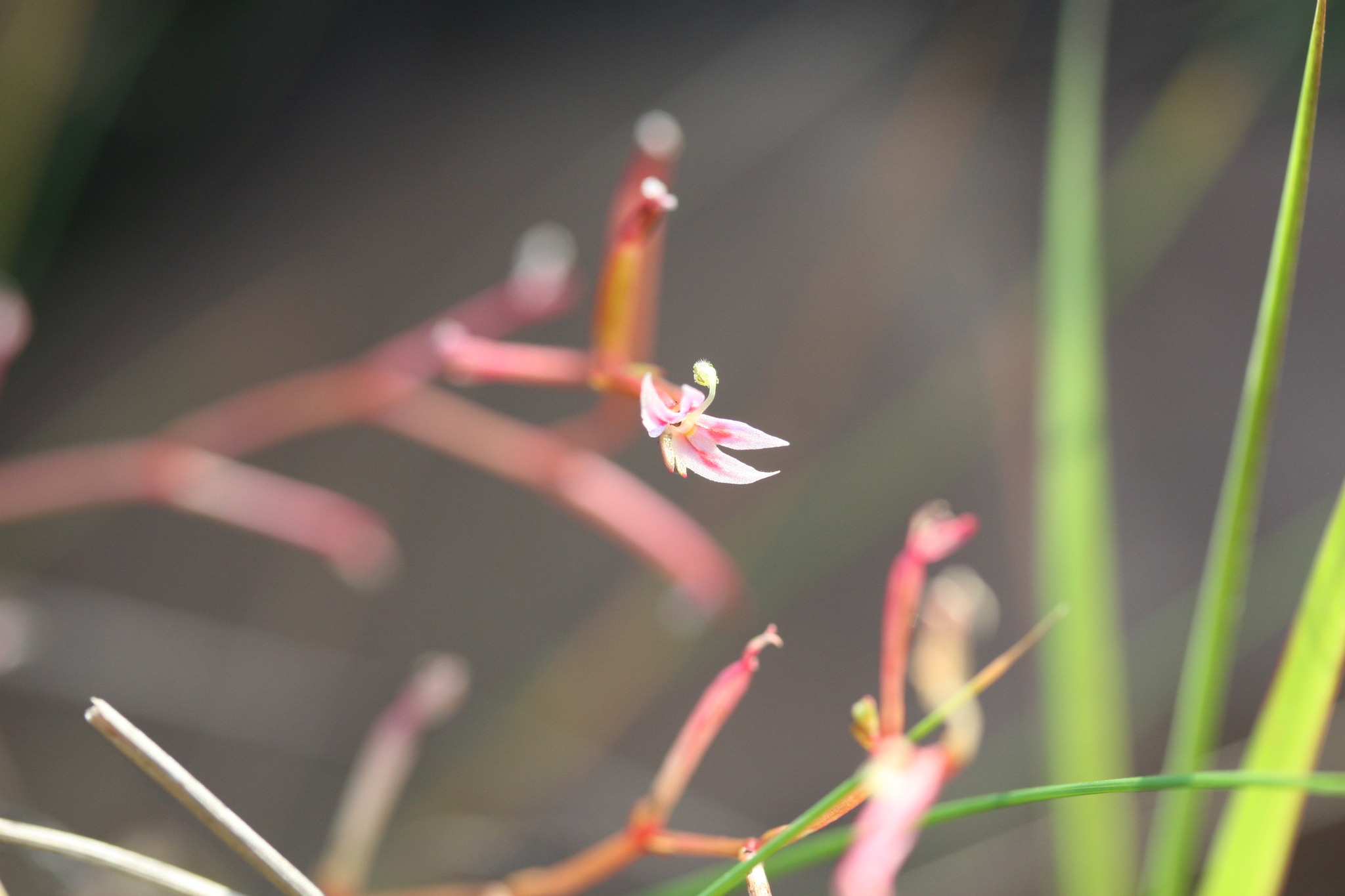

Scientific classification
- Kingdom: Plantae
- Clade: Tracheophytes
- Clade: Angiosperms
- Clade: Eudicots
- Clade: Asterids
- Order: Asterales
- Family: Stylidiaceae
- Genus: Stylidium
- Subgenus: Stylidium subg. Andersonia
- Section: Stylidium sect. Alsinoida
- Species: S. cordifolium

Binomial name
- Stylidium cordifolium W.Fitzg.

Synonyms
- S. alsinoides var. cordifolium Ewart, Jean White & B.Wood

= Stylidium cordifolium =

Species of carnivorous plant

Stylidium cordifolium is a dicotyledonous plant that belongs to the genus Stylidium (family Stylidiaceae). It is an erect annual plant that grows from 15 to 45 cm tall. Obovate or orbicular leaves, about 8-40 per plant, are scattered along the stems. The leaves are generally 3.5–8 mm long and about as wide. This species lacks a scape but has cymose inflorescences that are 4–13 cm long. Flowers are pink or red. S. cordifolium is found throughout tropical Australia, including northern Western Australia, in its typical habitat of swamp margins or moist sandy creekbanks. It flowers in the Southern Hemisphere from March to August. S. cordifolium is most closely related to S. javanicum, which has smaller leaves, sepals, capsules, and seeds. S. javanicum and S. cordifolium also differ in their distribution with S. javanicum's range not extending to Australia. Its conservation status has been assessed as data deficient.

== See also ==
- List of Stylidium species
