= Stylidium trichopodum =

Conservation status
- Rare (NCA)

Scientific classification
- Kingdom: Plantae
- Clade: Tracheophytes
- Clade: Angiosperms
- Clade: Eudicots
- Clade: Asterids
- Order: Asterales
- Family: Stylidiaceae
- Genus: Stylidium
- Subgenus: Stylidium subg. Andersonia
- Section: Stylidium sect. Uniflora
- Species: S. trichopodum

Binomial name
- Stylidium trichopodum F.Muell. 1876

Synonyms
- Candollea trichopoda (F.Muell.) F.Muell. 1883

Species of carnivorous plant

Stylidium trichopodum is a dicotyledonous plant that belongs to the genus Stylidium (family Stylidiaceae). It is an annual plant that grows from 6 to 20 cm tall. The linear leaves, about 20-200 per plant, are scattered along the elongate, glabrous stems. The leaves are generally 3–9 mm long and 0.2-0.7 mm wide. Petioles are absent. This species produces 1-10 scapes per plant. Inflorescences are 2.6–6 cm long and produce a single yellow or orange flower that blooms in June and July in the Southern Hemisphere. S. trichopodum is endemic to northern Queensland and is only known from a few populations. Its habitat is recorded as being moist sandy soils on flat or gently sloping terrain, sometimes in areas dominated by Melaleuca species. S. trichopodum is most closely related to S. pedunculatum, though it differs by its much larger flower and its cauline leaves instead of terminal rosettes for S. pedunculatum.

In his revision of the subgenus Andersonia, Anthony Bean noted that the conservation status as data deficient, but also mentioned that it is clearly rare. To back up his argument on the rarity of this species, he points to the fact that around 110 years had elapsed from the time the type specimen was collected and the next known collection.

== See also ==
- List of Stylidium species
