= Stylidium confertum =

Scientific classification
- Kingdom: Plantae
- Clade: Tracheophytes
- Clade: Angiosperms
- Clade: Eudicots
- Clade: Asterids
- Order: Asterales
- Family: Stylidiaceae
- Genus: Stylidium
- Subgenus: Stylidium subg. Andersonia
- Section: Stylidium sect. Tenella
- Species: S. confertum

Binomial name
- Stylidium confertum A.R.Bean

Species of carnivorous plant

Stylidium confertum is a dicotyledonous plant that belongs to the genus Stylidium (family Stylidiaceae). The specific epithet confertum refers to this species' crowded cluster of leaves at the base of the stem. It is an annual plant that grows from 6 to 21 cm tall. Linear or deltate leaves, about 15–100 per plant, are scattered along the elongate, glabrous stem. The leaves are generally 1.5–4 mm long and 0.2–0.7 mm wide. Petioles and scapes are absent. Inflorescences are 3–13 cm long. Flowers are white and bloom from April to May. S. confertum is only known from a couple populations in the wet tropic of northern Queensland from Tully and Cooktown. Its habitat is recorded as being damp, rocky creekbanks or open rock faces that are dominated by mosses and other species such as Micraira subulifolia and grow at altitudes from 100 to 880 metres. S. confertum is most closely related to S. fissilobum but differs mostly in the amount of leaves present at the base of the stem and corolla shape and size. Its conservation status has been assessed as data deficient.

== See also ==
- List of Stylidium species
