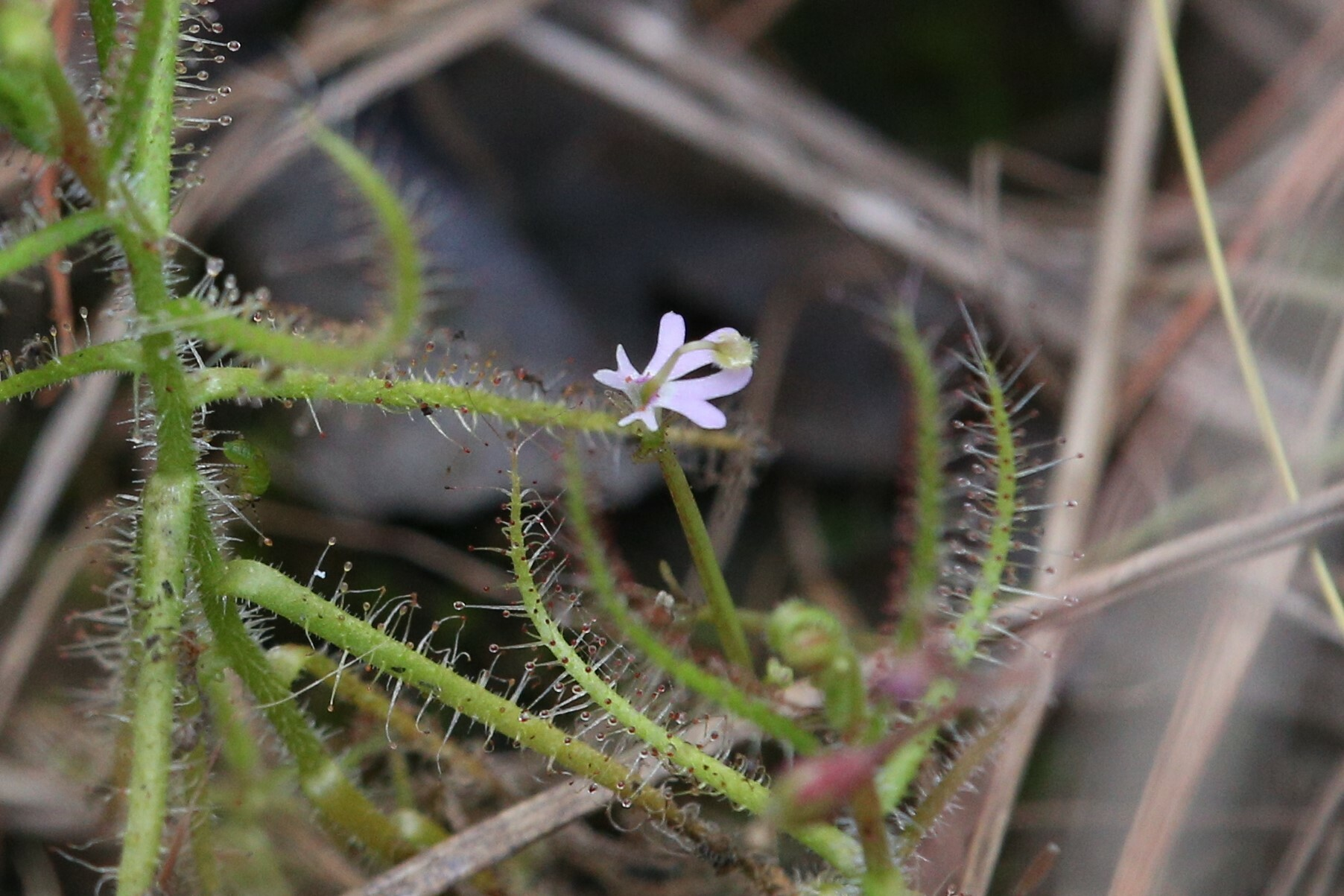

Scientific classification
- Kingdom: Plantae
- Clade: Embryophytes
- Clade: Tracheophytes
- Clade: Spermatophytes
- Clade: Angiosperms
- Clade: Eudicots
- Clade: Asterids
- Order: Asterales
- Family: Stylidiaceae
- Genus: Stylidium
- Subgenus: Stylidium subg. Andersonia
- Section: Stylidium sect. Tenella
- Species: S. diffusum

Binomial name
- Stylidium diffusum R.Br.

Synonyms
- Candollea diffusa (R.Br.) F.Muell.

= Stylidium diffusum =

Species of carnivorous plant

Stylidium diffusum is a species of dicotyledonous plant in the family Stylidiaceae. It is an annual plant that grows from 3 to 14 cm tall. Linear or deltate leaves, about 5–20 per plant, are scattered along the elongate, glabrous stem. The leaves are generally 2–8 mm long and 0.4–1.7 mm wide. Petioles and scapes are absent. Inflorescences are 1.5–8 cm long. Flowers are pink, white, or mauve and bloom from March to September in the Southern Hemisphere. S. diffusum's distribution is scattered along the east coast of Queensland and has populations recorded from Elcho Island and Groote Eylandt in the Northern Territory in Australia. It has been recorded as growing in Melaleuca viridiflora woodlands, soakage areas in eucalypt woodlands, on swamp edges, and on damp sandy creekbanks. S. diffusum is most closely related to S. tenellum. Its conservation status has been assessed as data deficient.

== See also ==
- List of Stylidium species
