= Stylidium fimbriatum =

Conservation status
- Priority Two — Poorly Known Taxa (DEC)

Scientific classification
- Kingdom: Plantae
- Clade: Tracheophytes
- Clade: Angiosperms
- Clade: Eudicots
- Clade: Asterids
- Order: Asterales
- Family: Stylidiaceae
- Genus: Stylidium
- Subgenus: Stylidium subg. Andersonia
- Section: Stylidium sect. Biloba
- Species: S. fimbriatum

Binomial name
- Stylidium fimbriatum Lowrie & Kenneally 1996

Species of carnivorous plant

Stylidium fimbriatum is a dicotyledonous plant that belongs to the genus Stylidium (family Stylidiaceae). It is an erect annual plant that grows from 15 to 30 cm tall. Oblanceolate leaves, about 16 per plant, form a basal rosette around the compressed stems. The leaves are generally 5–20 mm long and 2–7 mm wide. This species generally has one or two scapes and cymose inflorescences that are 15–30 cm long. Flowers are pink with yellow highlights. S. fimbriatum's distribution is confined to the area around Bachsten Creek in the Kimberley region in Western Australia. Its typical habitat is herbfields that are seasonally wet.

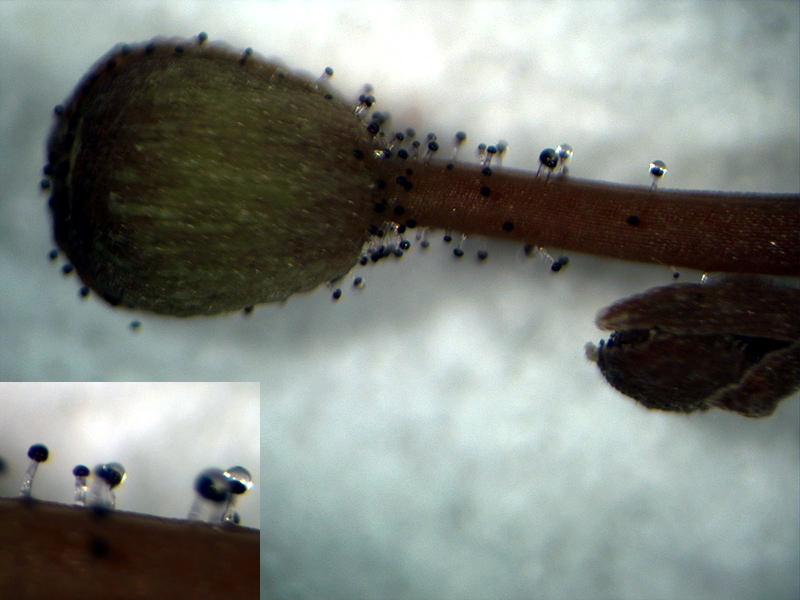
Inflorescence and flower bud of S. fimbriatum, displaying the glandular trichomes that digest and absorb prey nutrients

== See also ==
- List of Stylidium species
