= Stylidium accedens =

Scientific classification
- Kingdom: Plantae
- Clade: Tracheophytes
- Clade: Angiosperms
- Clade: Eudicots
- Clade: Asterids
- Order: Asterales
- Family: Stylidiaceae
- Genus: Stylidium
- Subgenus: Stylidium subg. Andersonia
- Section: Stylidium sect. Andersonia
- Species: S. accedens

Binomial name
- Stylidium accedens A.R.Bean

Species of carnivorous plant

Stylidium accedens is a dicotyledonous plant that belongs to the genus Stylidium (family Stylidiaceae). S. accedens is found around and northeast of Katherine in the Northern Territory of Australia.

The specific epithet is from the Latin accedens, which means "resembling", referring to the resemblance of this species to another Stylidium species, S. uliginosum, which it was often confused for in the past. It is an erect annual plant that grows from 4 to 15 cm tall. Obovate leaves, about 4-10 per plant, form a basal rosette. The leaves are generally 5–12 mm long and 2.5-5.5 mm wide. This species generally has one to two scapes and cymose inflorescences that are 4–15 cm long. Flowers are white.

Its typical habitat is a shallow, sandy soil on a sandstone plateau. It flowers in the Southern Hemisphere from June to July. S. accedens is most closely related to S. simulans. Its conservation status has been assessed as data deficient.

== See also ==
- List of Stylidium species
