= Stylidium stenophyllum =

Scientific classification
- Kingdom: Plantae
- Clade: Tracheophytes
- Clade: Angiosperms
- Clade: Eudicots
- Clade: Asterids
- Order: Asterales
- Family: Stylidiaceae
- Genus: Stylidium
- Subgenus: Stylidium subg. Andersonia
- Section: Stylidium sect. Andersonia
- Species: S. stenophyllum

Binomial name
- Stylidium stenophyllum A.R.Bean 2000

Species of carnivorous plant

Stylidium stenophyllum is a dicotyledonous plant that belongs to the genus Stylidium (family Stylidiaceae) that was described by A.R. Bean in 2000. It is an erect annual plant that grows from 30 to 40 cm tall. Linear leaves, about 7-25 per plant, are scattered along the stems. The leaves are generally 36–86 mm long and 1.5-2.5 mm wide. This species generally has three to four scapes and cymose inflorescences that are 28–39 cm long. Flowers are white or pink. S. stenophyllum is endemic to the far northeastern Northern Territory of Australia and is only known from the type location. It has only been recorded from one sandstone monolith known as a beehive formation (so named due to its shape) where less than 100 clumps of plants survive at the concentration of about 10 individual plants per clump. For this reason, A.R. Bean suggested a vulnerable conservation status. However it currently appears on neither the IUCN Red List nor the EPBC Act list of threatened flora.

Its typical habitat is in the deep crevices of the sandstone beehive formations. It flowers in the Southern Hemisphere from June to July. S. stenophyllum is most closely related to S. pachyrrhizum.

== See also ==
- List of Stylidium species
