= Stylidium candelabrum =

Scientific classification
- Kingdom: Plantae
- Clade: Tracheophytes
- Clade: Angiosperms
- Clade: Eudicots
- Clade: Asterids
- Order: Asterales
- Family: Stylidiaceae
- Genus: Stylidium
- Subgenus: Stylidium subg. Andersonia
- Section: Stylidium sect. Andersonia
- Species: S. candelabrum

Binomial name
- Stylidium candelabrum Lowrie & Kenneally

Species of carnivorous plant

Stylidium candelabrum is a dicotyledonous plant that belongs to the genus Stylidium (family Stylidiaceae). It is an erect annual plant that grows from 6 to 20 cm tall. Elliptical leaves, about 11-100 per plant, are scattered along the stem. The leaves are generally 2.5–18 mm long and 1.5–9 mm wide. This species generally has 1-13 scapes and cymose inflorescences that are 3–16 cm long. Flowers are white. S. candelabrum is endemic to the northernmost area of the Northern Territory in Australia and much of its range is within a national park and therefore has been evaluated to be neither rare nor threatened. Its typical habitat is shallow sand associated with sandstone pavements and it appears to prefer areas with higher rainfall. It flowers in the Southern Hemisphere from March to July. Its conservation status has been assessed as secure.

== See also ==
- List of Stylidium species
