= Stylidium mitrasacmoides =

Stylidium mitrasacmoides may refer to the following species:

- Stylidium mitrasacmoides Carlquist, a taxonomic synonym for Stylidium nominatum
- Stylidium mitrasacmoides F.Muell., a taxonomic synonym for Stylidium alsinoides
