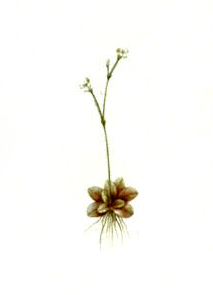
- S. tenerum from the 1770 Endeavour voyage of James Cook, collected from the Endeavour River.

Scientific classification
- Kingdom: Plantae
- Clade: Embryophytes
- Clade: Tracheophytes
- Clade: Spermatophytes
- Clade: Angiosperms
- Clade: Eudicots
- Clade: Asterids
- Order: Asterales
- Family: Stylidiaceae
- Genus: Stylidium
- Subgenus: Stylidium subg. Andersonia
- Section: Stylidium sect. Andersonia
- Species: S. tenerum

Binomial name
- Stylidium tenerum Spreng. 1826

= Stylidium tenerum =

Species of carnivorous plant

Stylidium tenerum, the swamp triggerplant, is a dicotyledonous plant that belongs to the genus Stylidium (family Stylidiaceae) that was described by Curt Polycarp Joachim Sprengel in 1826. Robert Brown had described this species in 1810 under the name S. tenellum, a name which had already been used for another species in 1805 by Olof Swartz. To add to the confusion, Rica Erickson had described and illustrated this taxon in 1958 under the name S. uliginosum, another currently accepted name for a related species.

S. tenerum is an erect annual plant that grows from 3 to 20 cm tall. Obovate or orbicular leaves, about 4-10 per plant, form basal rosettes. The leaves are generally 4–17.5 mm long and 3–8 mm wide. This species generally has one to seven scapes and cymose inflorescences that are 3–20 cm long. Flowers are white. S. tenerum has a wide distribution in Australia ranging from eastern Queensland and extreme northeastern New South Wales up to the Wessel Islands of the Northern Territory in Australia. It has also been located in Papua New Guinea. Its typical habitats include the sandy soils of creekbanks, seepage areas, and coastal lowlands in open Melaleuca communities. It flowers in the Southern Hemisphere from April to October.

== See also ==
- List of Stylidium species
