= Acacia brassii =

Scientific classification
- Kingdom: Plantae
- Clade: Tracheophytes
- Clade: Angiosperms
- Clade: Eudicots
- Clade: Rosids
- Order: Fabales
- Family: Fabaceae
- Subfamily: Caesalpinioideae
- Clade: Mimosoid clade
- Genus: Acacia
- Species: A. brassii

Binomial name
- Acacia brassii Pedley
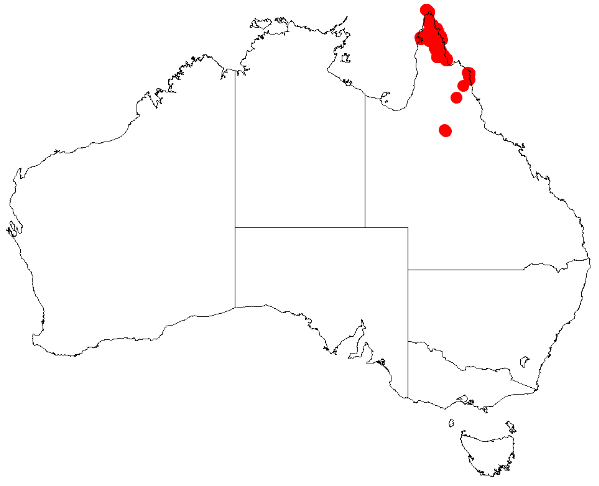
- Occurrence data from AVH

Synonyms
- Racosperma brassii (Pedley) Pedley

Species of legume

Acacia brassii is a species of flowering plant in the family Fabaceae and is endemic to Cape York Peninsula. It is a tree with furrowed grey to dark brown bark, lance-shaped to narrowly egg-shaped phyllodes, cylindrical heads of golden yellow flowers, and linear, terete, leathery to crust-like pods.

== Description ==
Acacia brassii is a tree that typically grows to a height of up to 10 m (33 ft) with furrowed, grey to dark brown bark. Its branchlets are dark red to brown, more or less glabrous with prominent scaly ridges and flattened near the tip. The phyllodes are lance-shaped or narrowly egg-shaped and sickle-shaped, mostly 110–190 mm (4.3–7.5 in) long, 15–30 mm (0.59–1.18 in) wide and leathery with three prominent veins. The flowers are golden yellow, borne in cylindrical spikes 30–50 mm (1.2–2.0 in) long. Flowering occurs in June and July and the pods are linear, terete, striated, leathery to crust-like and appear like a string of beads 40–130 mm (1.6–5.1 in) long. The seeds are brown, 2.8 to 3.7 mm (0.11 to 0.15 in) long.

== Taxonomy ==
Acacia brassii was first formally described in 1974 by Leslie Pedley in Contributions from the Queensland Herbarium from specimens collected near the Wenlock River 60 mi (97 km) north-north-west of Coen in 1968. The specific epithet (brassii) honours Leonard John Brass.

== Distribution and habitat ==
This species of wattle is very common on Cape York Peninsula where it grows in deep, sandy soils along creeks and rivers in scrubland communities, often with Melaleuca viridiflora.

== Conservation status ==
Acacia brassii is listed as of "least concern" under the Queensland Government Nature Conservation Act 1992.

== See also ==
- List of Acacia species
