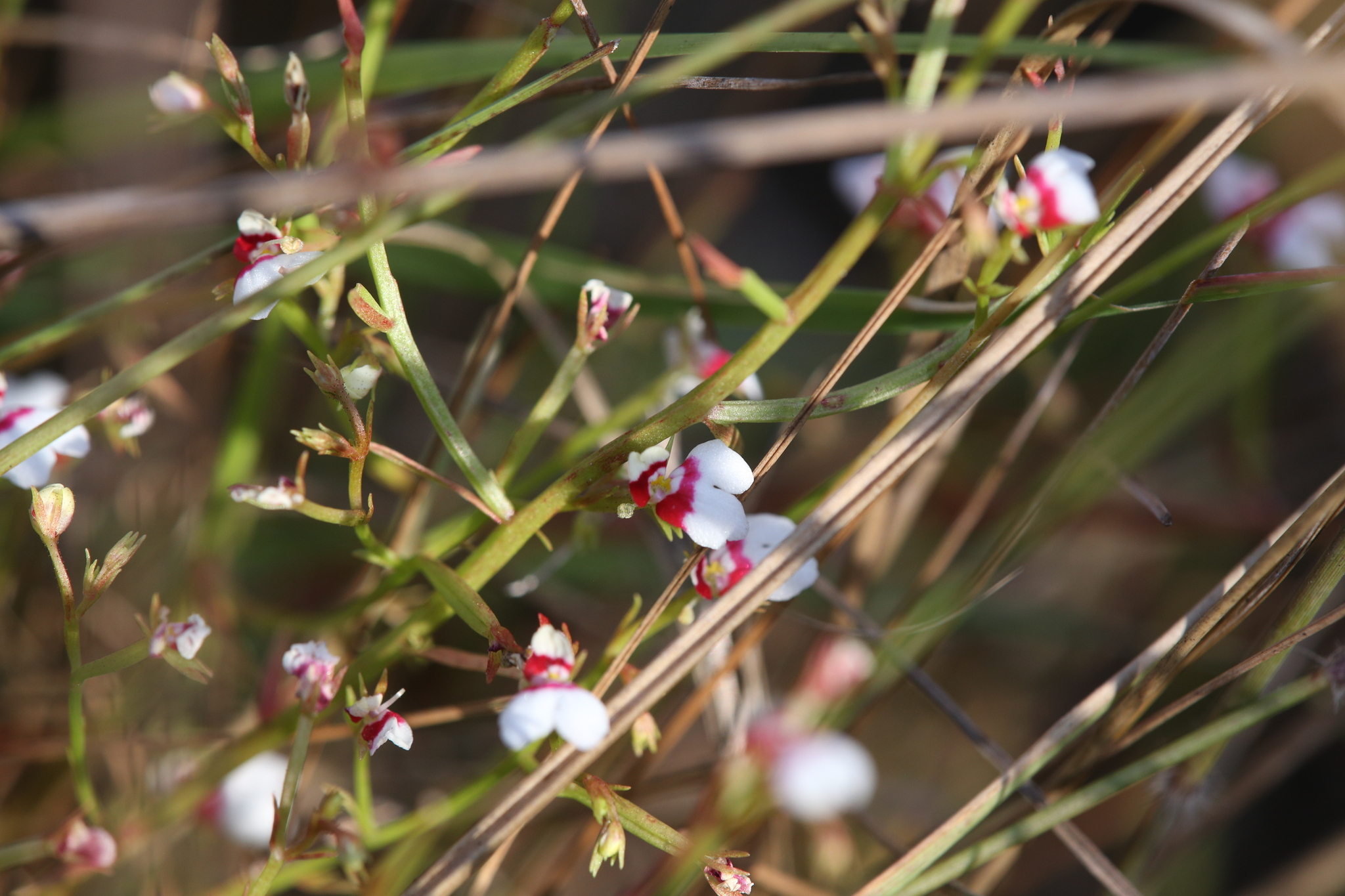

Scientific classification
- Kingdom: Plantae
- Clade: Tracheophytes
- Clade: Angiosperms
- Clade: Eudicots
- Clade: Asterids
- Order: Asterales
- Family: Stylidiaceae
- Genus: Stylidium
- Subgenus: Stylidium subg. Andersonia
- Section: Stylidium sect. Alsinoida
- Species: S. tenerrimum

Binomial name
- Stylidium tenerrimum F.Muell.

Synonyms
- Candollea tenerrima (F.Muell.) F.Muell.; S. evolutum Carlquist; S. mitrasacmoides F.Muell.

= Stylidium tenerrimum =

Species of carnivorous plant

Stylidium tenerrimum is a species of dicotyledonous plant in the family Stylidiaceae. It is an erect annual plant that grows from 4 to 30 cm tall. Linear, oblanceolate, or deltate leaves, about 5-24 per plant, are scattered along the stems. The leaves are generally 1.2-4.8 mm long and 0.3-0.8 mm wide. This species lacks a scape but has cymose inflorescences that are 4–11 cm long. Flowers are white and red. S. tenerrimum is found around Darwin in the Northern Territory of Australia and the Victoria River, though it hasn't been recollected there since the type location was chosen. Its typical habitat is sandy soils that remain moist, associated with grasses and sedges. It flowers in the Southern Hemisphere from April to August. S. tenerrimum is most closely related to S. alsinoides, though it differs by its asymmetrical petals. In his revision of the subgenus Andersonia in 2000, A.R. Bean placed S. evolutum into synonymy and noted that the type specimen of S. mitrasacmoides was not located and thus the application of this synonym is not certain. Tony Bean assessed this species' conservation status as data deficient in 2000.

== See also ==
- List of Stylidium species
