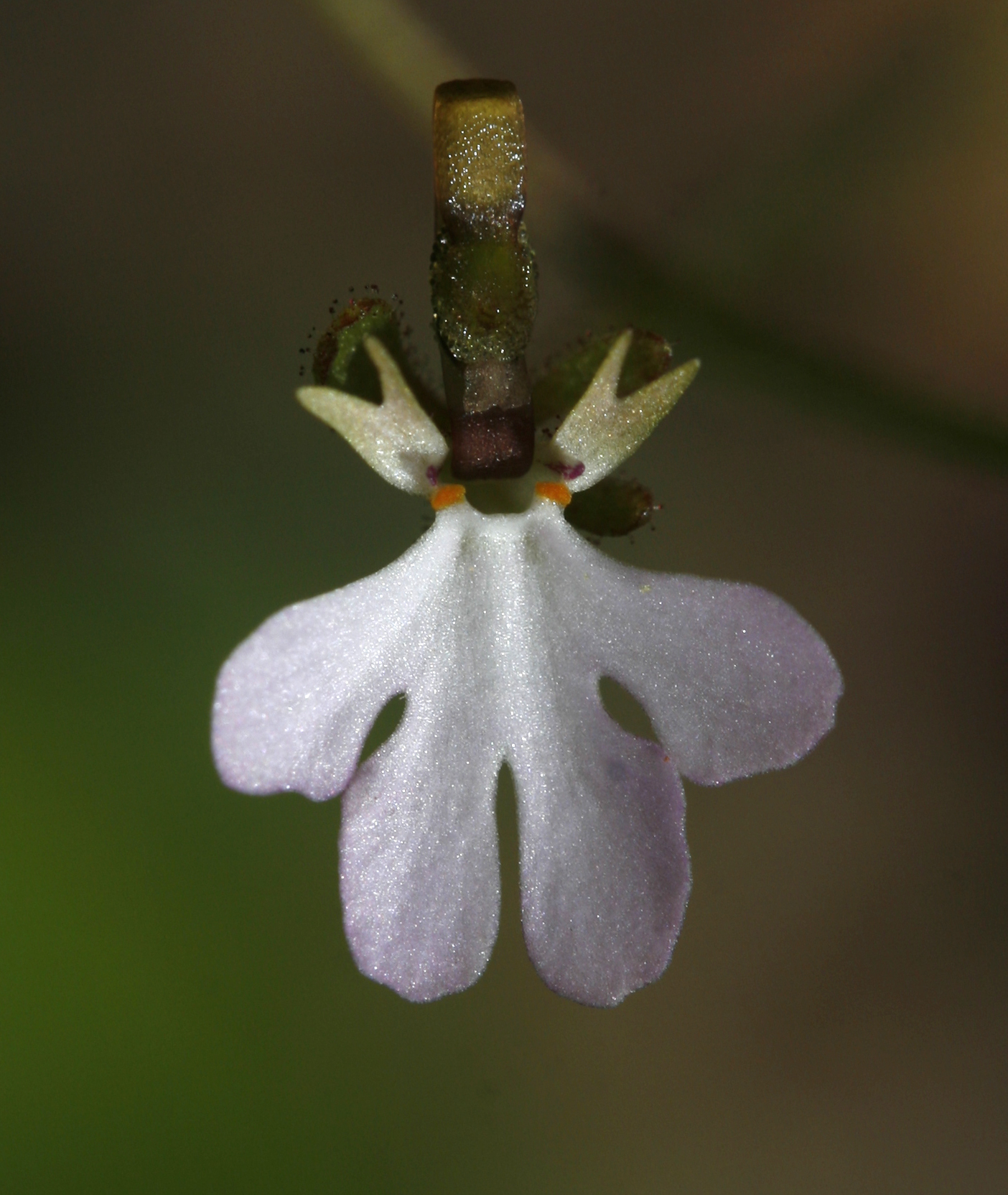

Scientific classification
- Kingdom: Plantae
- Clade: Tracheophytes
- Clade: Angiosperms
- Clade: Eudicots
- Clade: Asterids
- Order: Asterales
- Family: Stylidiaceae
- Genus: Stylidium
- Subgenus: Stylidium subg. Andersonia
- Section: Stylidium sect. Andersonia
- Species: S. pachyrrhizum

Binomial name
- Stylidium pachyrrhizum F.Muell. 1859

Synonyms
- Candollea pachyrrhiza (F.Muell.) F.Muell. 1883

= Stylidium pachyrrhizum =

Species of carnivorous plant

Stylidium pachyrrhizum is a dicotyledonous plant that belongs to the genus Stylidium (family Stylidiaceae) that was described by Ferdinand von Mueller in 1859. It is an erect annual plant that grows from 15 to 40 cm tall. Obovate or oblanceolate leaves, about 5-30 per plant, are scattered along the stems. The leaves are generally 13–100 mm long and 3.5–24 mm wide. This species generally has one to six scapes and cymose inflorescences that are 13–33 cm long. Flowers are white or pink. S. pachyrrhizum's distribution ranges from western Kimberley in Western Australia and extends to Groote Eylandt off the east coast of the Northern Territory. Its typical habitats are swamp margins or seepage areas near sandy or rocky creeks. It flowers in the Southern Hemisphere from March to June. S. pachyrrhizum is most closely related to S. schizanthum and S. stenophyllum and some specimens are hard to differentiate between S. pachyrrhizum and S. schizanthum.

== See also ==
- List of Stylidium species
