= Stylidium claytonioides =

Scientific classification
- Kingdom: Plantae
- Clade: Tracheophytes
- Clade: Angiosperms
- Clade: Eudicots
- Clade: Asterids
- Order: Asterales
- Family: Stylidiaceae
- Genus: Stylidium
- Subgenus: Stylidium subg. Andersonia
- Section: Stylidium sect. Uniflora
- Species: S. claytonioides

Binomial name
- Stylidium claytonioides W.Fitzg.

Species of carnivorous plant

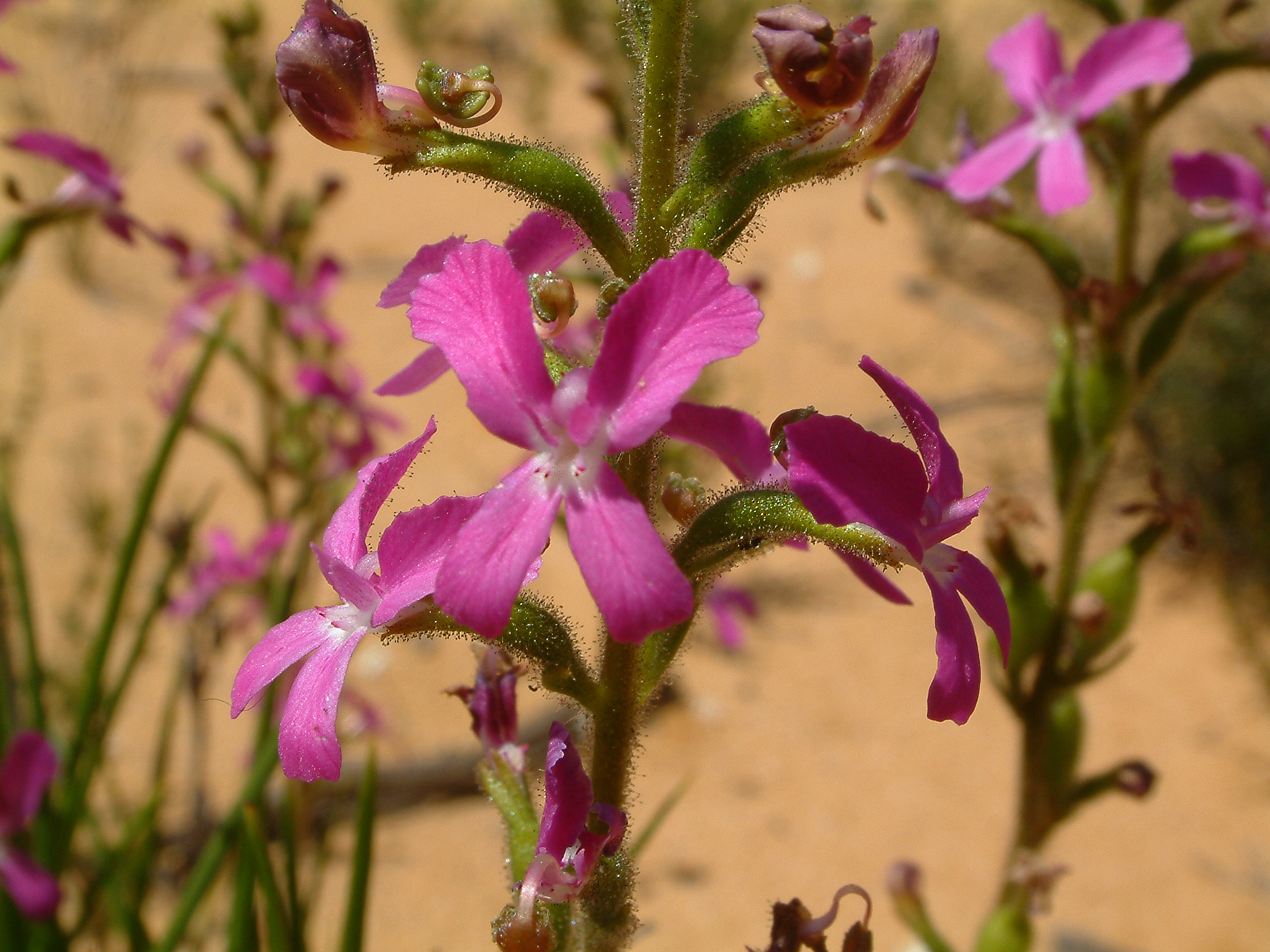

Stylidium claytonioides is a dicotyledonous plant that belongs to the genus Stylidium (family Stylidiaceae). It is an annual plant that grows from 15 to 27 cm tall. The linear leaves, about 9-30 per plant, are mostly in terminal rosettes but with some scattered along the elongate, glabrous stem. The leaves are generally 12–24 mm long and 0.7–1 mm wide. Petioles are absent. This species produces one to six scapes per plant. Inflorescences are 10–18 cm long and produces a single pink and mauve flower that blooms from May to June in the Southern Hemisphere. S. claytonioides is endemic to the Kimberley region in Western Australia. Its habitat is recorded as being seasonal swamps near sandstone outcroppings and near creekbanks. Its conservation status has been assessed as data deficient.

== See also ==
- List of Stylidium species
