= Stylidium dunlopianum =

Scientific classification
- Kingdom: Plantae
- Clade: Tracheophytes
- Clade: Angiosperms
- Clade: Eudicots
- Clade: Asterids
- Order: Asterales
- Family: Stylidiaceae
- Genus: Stylidium
- Subgenus: Stylidium subg. Andersonia
- Section: Stylidium sect. Biloba
- Species: S. dunlopianum

Binomial name
- Stylidium dunlopianum Carlquist

Species of carnivorous plant

Stylidium dunlopianum is a dicotyledonous plant that belongs to the genus Stylidium (family Stylidiaceae). It is an erect perennial plant that grows from 15 to 50 cm tall. Obovate leaves, about 6-12 per plant, form a basal rosette with some scattered along the stem. The leaves are generally 20–60 mm long and 7–19 mm wide. This species generally has one to five scapes and cymose inflorescences that are 13–40 cm long. Flowers are pink or mauve. S. dunlopianum's distribution ranges from the Mitchell River area in Western Australia east to the Kakadu National Park in the Northern Territory. Its typical habitats include sandy or black organic soils along creekbanks, near rainforests, or in seepage areas in Melaleuca leucadendra swamps. It flowers in the Southern Hemisphere from May to November. S. dunlopianum is most closely related to S. rotundifolium, but differs most significantly by its thickened stem base and growth habit. S. dunlopianum is a perennial whereas S. rotundifolium is an annual. Its conservation status has been assessed as data deficient.

== See also ==
- List of Stylidium species
