= Punekar =

Punekar is a surname native to Indian state of Maharashtra. Punekar means an inhabitant or native of Pune.

== Notable people ==
Notable people with the surname include:

- Shankar Mokashi Punekar - a well known writer in the Kannada language.
- Surekha Punekar - Folk dancer
- Rekha Punekar- an Indian cricketer
- Sachin Anil Punekar - an Indian botanist and ornithologist
