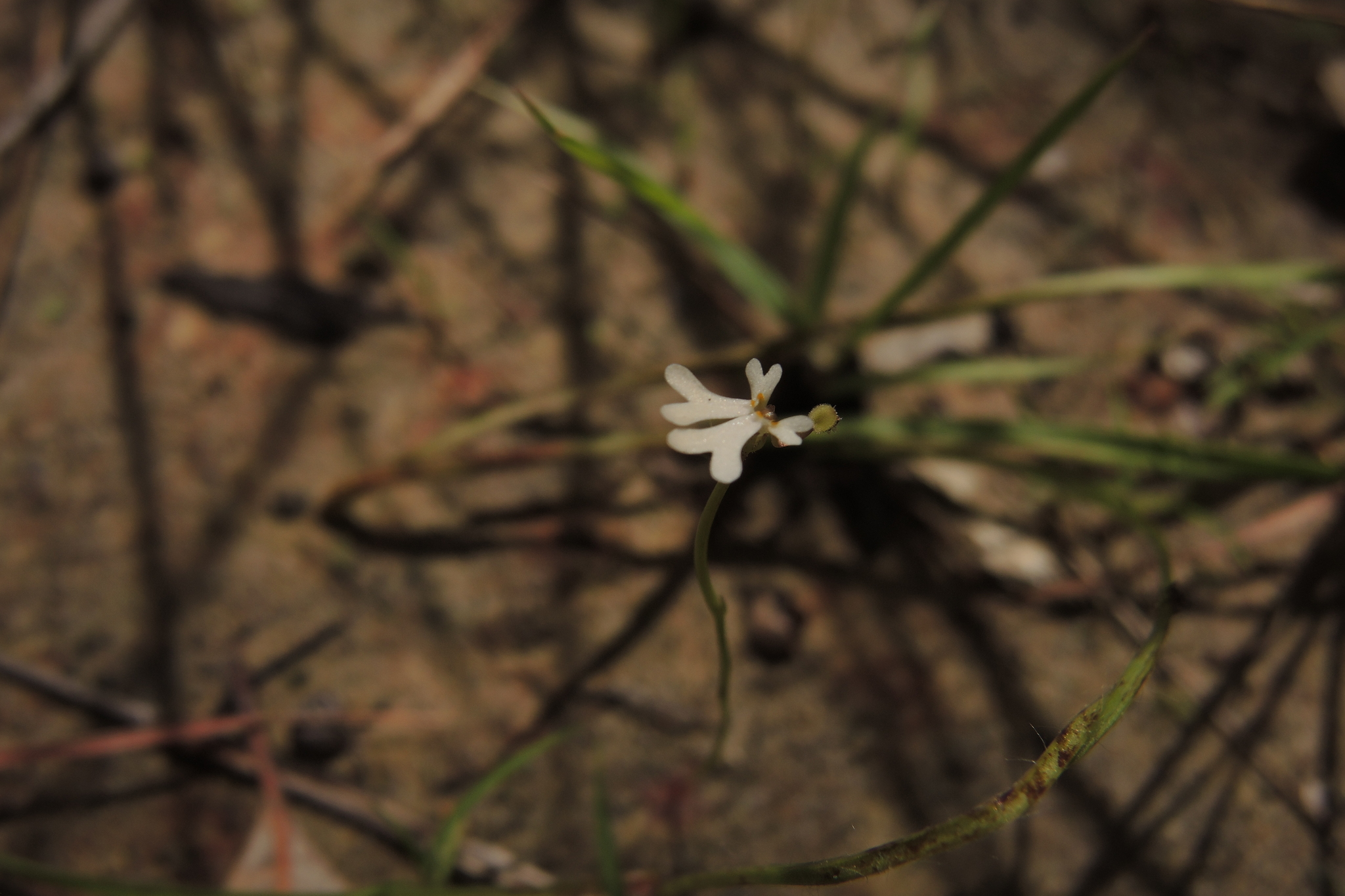

Scientific classification
- Kingdom: Plantae
- Clade: Tracheophytes
- Clade: Angiosperms
- Clade: Eudicots
- Clade: Asterids
- Order: Asterales
- Family: Stylidiaceae
- Genus: Stylidium
- Subgenus: Stylidium subg. Andersonia
- Section: Stylidium sect. Tenella
- Species: S. capillare

Binomial name
- Stylidium capillare R.Br.

Synonyms
- Candollea capillaris (R.Br.) F.Muell.; Stylidium quadrifurcatum F.L.Erickson & J.H.Willis

= Stylidium capillare =

Species of carnivorous plant

Stylidium capillare is a dicotyledonous plant that belongs to the genus Stylidium (family Stylidiaceae). It is an annual plant that grows from 6 to 13 cm tall. Obovate or orbicular leaves, about 4-7 per plant, form basal rosettes around the compressed stems. The leaves are generally 1.5–5 mm long and 1–3 mm wide. Petioles are absent. This species usually has one to two scapes per plant and 6–13 cm long inflorescences. Flowers are white and bloom from March to June in the Southern Hemisphere. S. capillare's distribution ranges from Litchfield National Park in the Northern Territory east to Cooktown Mareeba in northern Queensland, Australia. Its habitat is recorded as being sandy soils in eucalypt woodlands and swampy Melaleuca species communities. S. capillare is most closely related to S. nominatum. Its conservation status has been assessed as secure.

== See also ==
- List of Stylidium species
