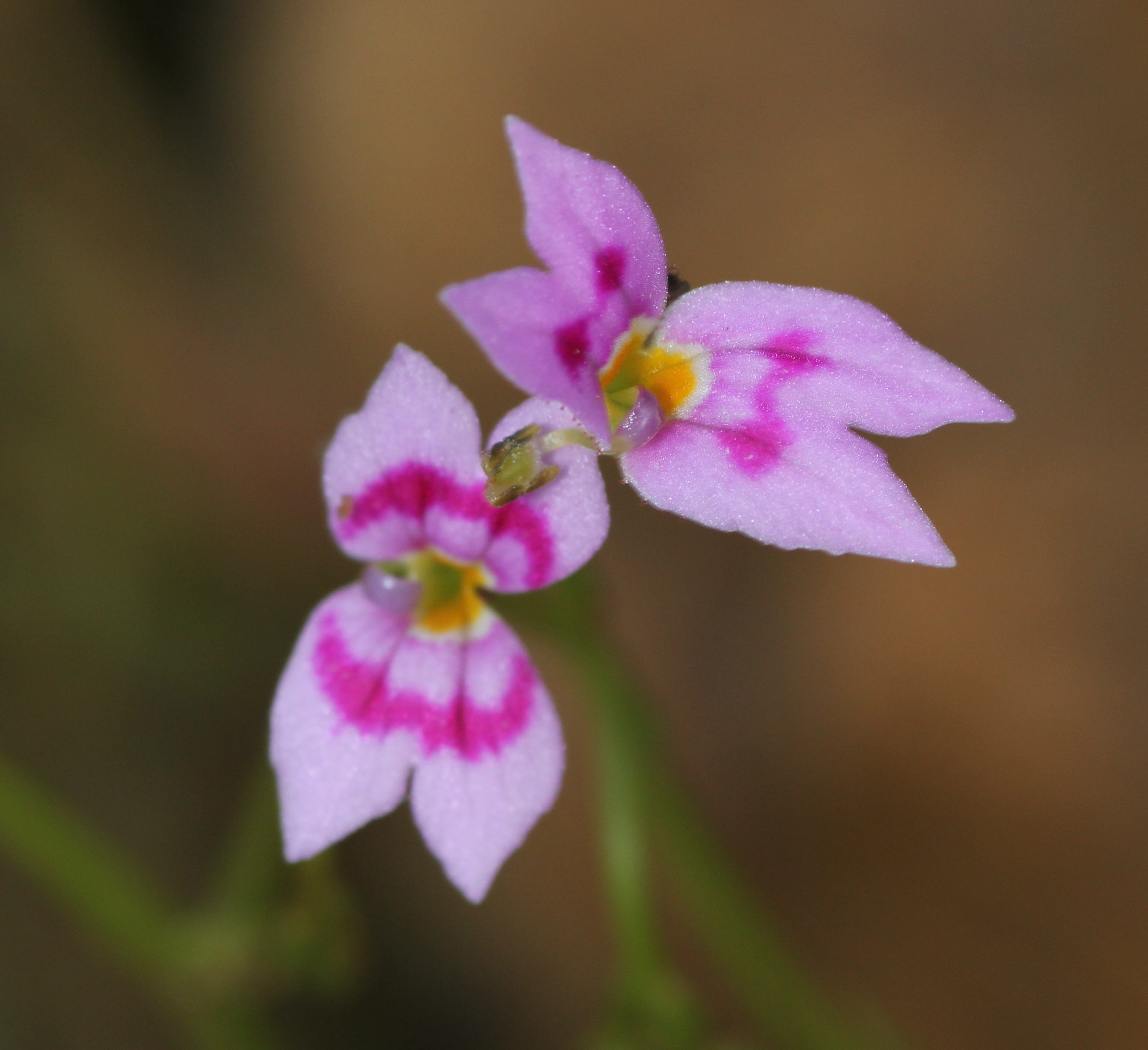

Scientific classification
- Kingdom: Plantae
- Clade: Tracheophytes
- Clade: Angiosperms
- Clade: Eudicots
- Clade: Asterids
- Order: Asterales
- Family: Stylidiaceae
- Genus: Stylidium
- Subgenus: Stylidium subg. Andersonia
- Section: Stylidium sect. Alsinoida
- Species: S. fluminense

Binomial name
- Stylidium fluminense Erickson & J.H.Willis

= Stylidium fluminense =

Species of carnivorous plant

Stylidium fluminense is a dicotyledonous plant that belongs to the genus Stylidium (family Stylidiaceae).

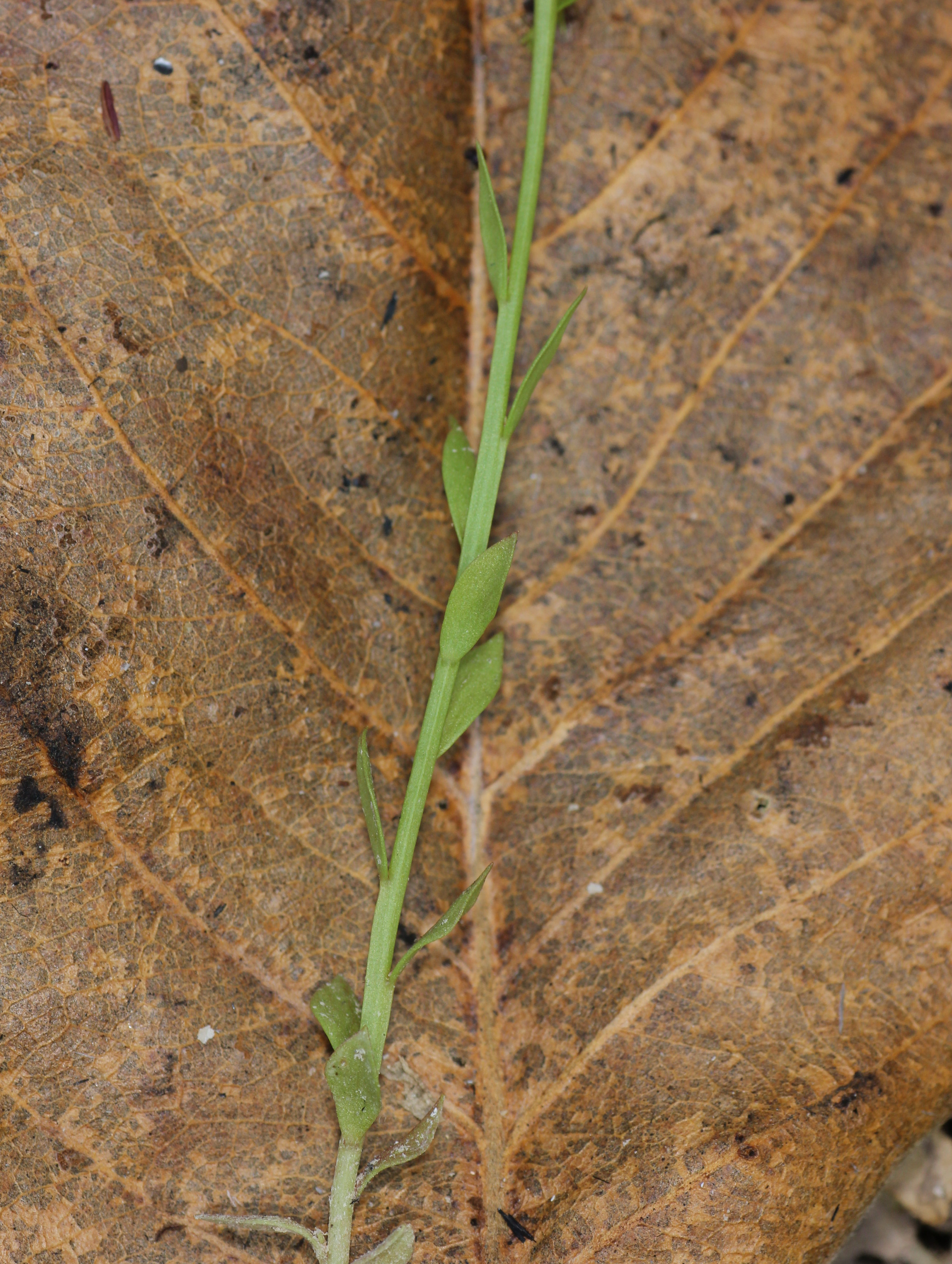

It is an erect annual plant that grows from 15 to 30 cm tall. Elliptical leaves, about 10-40 per plant, are scattered along the stems. The leaves are generally 5–19 mm long and 1.5–6 mm wide. This species lacks a scape but has cymose inflorescences that are 5–11 cm long. Flowers are pink, mauve, or red.

S. fluminense is found in northwestern Australia, including confirmed locations in the Hamersley Ranges and the Harding River near Karratha. Its typical habitat is sheltered sites with persistent moisture in sandstone gorges. It flowers in the Southern Hemisphere from June to October. S. fluminense is most closely related to S. alsinoides. Its conservation status has been assessed as data deficient.

== See also ==
- List of Stylidium species
