= Stylidium perizoster =

Conservation status
- Priority Three — Poorly Known Taxa (DEC)

Scientific classification
- Kingdom: Plantae
- Clade: Tracheophytes
- Clade: Angiosperms
- Clade: Eudicots
- Clade: Asterids
- Order: Asterales
- Family: Stylidiaceae
- Genus: Stylidium
- Subgenus: Stylidium subg. Andersonia
- Section: Stylidium sect. Uniflora
- Species: S. perizoster

Binomial name
- Stylidium perizoster Lowrie & Kenneally 1997

Species of carnivorous plant

Stylidium perizoster is a species of dicotyledonous plant in the family Stylidiaceae. It is an annual plant that grows from 5 to 11 cm tall. The linear leaves, about 8–12 per plant, are mostly in terminal rosettes but with some scattered along the elongate, glabrous stem. The leaves are around 7.5 mm long and 0.4-0.7 mm wide. Petioles are absent. This species produces 1-10 scapes per plant. Inflorescences are around 9 cm long and produce a single white, yellow, and orange flower. S. perizostera is endemic to the Kimberley region in Western Australia and ranges from the Mitchell Plateau to Bigge Island. Its habitat is recorded as being near sandstone outcrops in drainage lines.

== See also ==
- List of Stylidium species
