= Stylidium simulans =

Scientific classification
- Kingdom: Plantae
- Clade: Tracheophytes
- Clade: Angiosperms
- Clade: Eudicots
- Clade: Asterids
- Order: Asterales
- Family: Stylidiaceae
- Genus: Stylidium
- Subgenus: Stylidium subg. Andersonia
- Section: Stylidium sect. Andersonia
- Species: S. simulans

Binomial name
- Stylidium simulans Carlquist

Species of carnivorous plant

Stylidium simulans is a dicotyledonous plant that belongs to the genus Stylidium (family Stylidiaceae) that was described by Sherwin Carlquist in 1979. It is an erect annual plant that grows from 7 to 11 cm tall. Orbicular leaves, about 4-10 per plant, form basal rosettes. The leaves are generally 3–5.5 mm long and 1.5-3.5 mm wide. This species generally has one or two scapes and cymose inflorescences that are 7–11 cm long. Flowers are pale pink or mauve. S. simulans is endemic to the Arnhem Land plateau in the Northern Territory of Australia, but not much more is known about its distribution as it is only known from around its type location. Its reported habitat is in shallow sandy soils on a sandstone plateau. It flowers in the Southern Hemisphere in June. S. simulans is closely related to S. accedens. Its conservation status has been assessed as data deficient.

== See also ==
- List of Stylidium species
