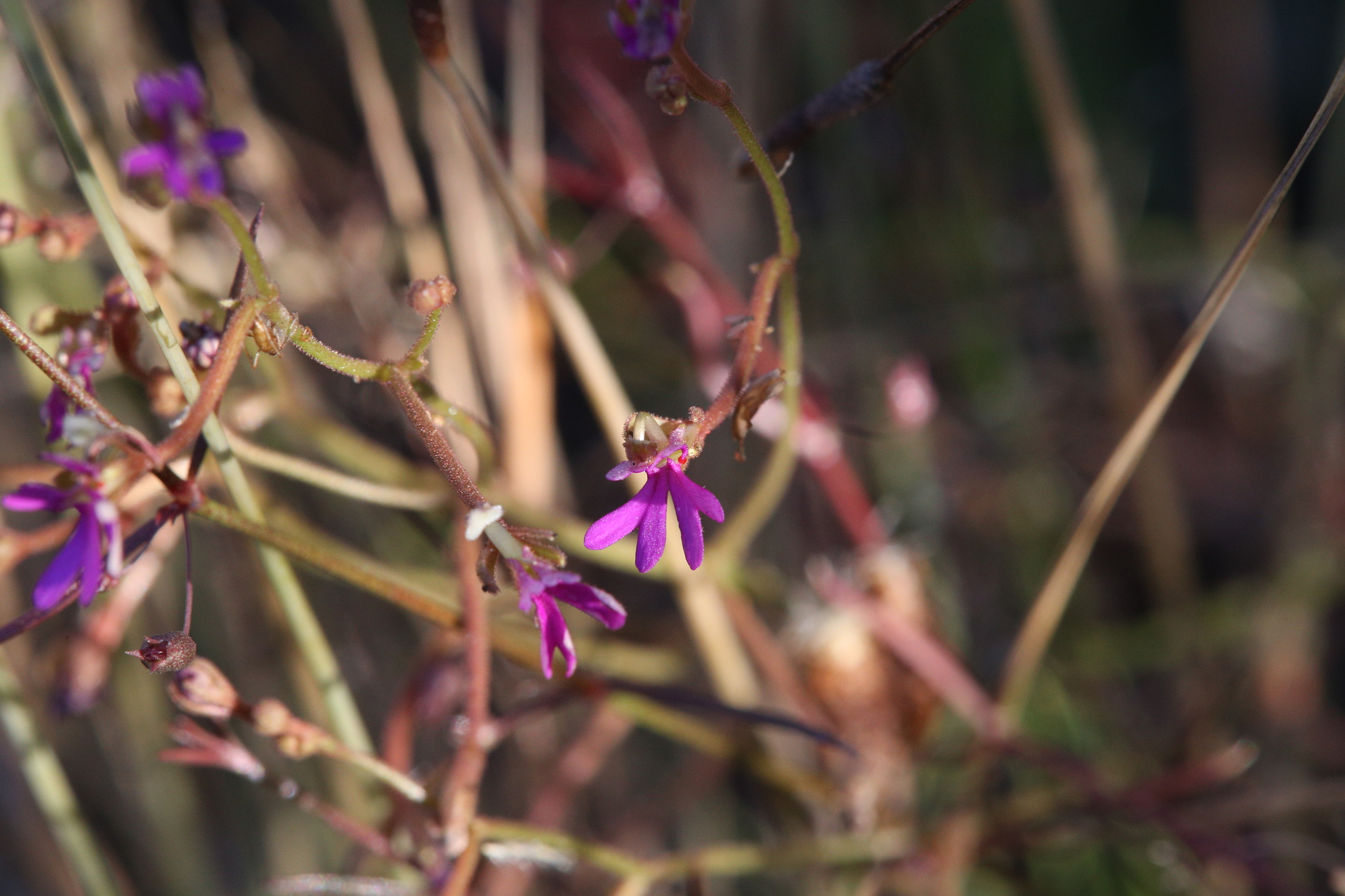

Scientific classification
- Kingdom: Plantae
- Clade: Tracheophytes
- Clade: Angiosperms
- Clade: Eudicots
- Clade: Asterids
- Order: Asterales
- Family: Stylidiaceae
- Genus: Stylidium
- Subgenus: Stylidium subg. Andersonia
- Section: Stylidium sect. Andersonia
- Species: S. lobuliflorum

Binomial name
- Stylidium lobuliflorum F.Muell.

Synonyms
- Candollea lobuliflora (F.Muell.) F.Muell.

= Stylidium lobuliflorum =

Species of carnivorous plant

Stylidium lobuliflorum is a dicotyledonous species of plant, with a native range is concentrated in and around Kimberley in Western Australia and extends to the Northern Territory.

It belongs to the genus Stylidium (family Stylidiaceae) that was described by Ferdinand von Mueller in 1859. It is an erect annual plant that grows from 12 to 20 cm tall. Obovate or orbicular leaves, about 4-15 per plant, form basal rosettes. The leaves are generally 6–9.5 mm long and 4–6.5 mm wide. This species generally has one to three scapes and cymose inflorescences that are 12–20 cm long. Flowers are pink or mauve.

Its habitat has been reported as being seepage areas, streambanks, sandstone pavement, or sandy depressions. It flowers in the Southern Hemisphere from April to August. S. lobuliflorum is most closely related to S. schizanthum. Its conservation status has been assessed as secure.

== See also ==
- List of Stylidium species
