= Stylidium javanicum =

Scientific classification
- Kingdom: Plantae
- Clade: Tracheophytes
- Clade: Angiosperms
- Clade: Eudicots
- Clade: Asterids
- Order: Asterales
- Family: Stylidiaceae
- Genus: Stylidium
- Subgenus: Stylidium subg. Andersonia
- Section: Stylidium sect. Alsinoida
- Species: S. javanicum

Binomial name
- Stylidium javanicum Slooten

Species of carnivorous plant

Stylidium javanicum is a dicotyledonous plant that belongs to the genus Stylidium (family Stylidiaceae). It is an erect annual plant that grows from 5 to 21 cm tall. Obovate or elliptical leaves, about 10-30 per plant, are scattered along the stems. The leaves are generally 1.7-4.5 mm long and 0.9-2.1 mm wide. This species lacks a scape but has cymose inflorescences that are 5–9 cm long. Flowers are pink or mauve. S. javanicum is found in Java, east Sumba island, and from eastern New Guinea. Its typical habitats are open boggy depressions and wet grassy fields at 20 to 500 metres above sea level. It flowers in the Southern Hemisphere from April to May. S. javanicum is most closely related to S. cordifolium, which has larger leaves, sepals, capsules, and seeds. S. javanicum and S. cordifolium also differ in their distribution with S. cordifolium's range endemic to northern Australia.

== See also ==
- List of Stylidium species
