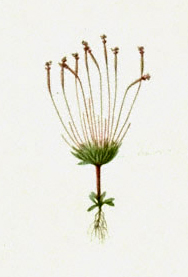
- Botanical illustration of S. pedunculatum from James Cook's 1770s voyage.

Scientific classification
- Kingdom: Plantae
- Clade: Embryophytes
- Clade: Tracheophytes
- Clade: Spermatophytes
- Clade: Angiosperms
- Clade: Eudicots
- Clade: Asterids
- Order: Asterales
- Family: Stylidiaceae
- Genus: Stylidium
- Subgenus: Stylidium subg. Andersonia
- Section: Stylidium sect. Uniflora
- Species: S. pedunculatum

Binomial name
- Stylidium pedunculatum R.Br.

Synonyms
- Candollea pedunculata (R.Br.) F.Muell.; Stylidium bryoides F.Muell.; Stylidium curtum Carlquist

= Stylidium pedunculatum =

Species of carnivorous plant

Stylidium pedunculatum is a dicotyledonous plant that belongs to the genus Stylidium (family Stylidiaceae). It is an annual plant that grows from 5 to 10 cm tall. The linear or deltate leaves, about 20-200 per plant, are mostly in terminal rosettes but with some scattered along the elongate stem. The leaves are generally 4.5-8.5 mm long and 0.5-0.8 mm wide. Petioles are absent. This species produces 2-14 scapes per plant. Inflorescences are 4–7 cm long and produces a single white or pink flower that blooms from March to September in the Southern Hemisphere. S. pedunculatum's distribution is scattered in the tropical areas of Australia (Queensland and the Northern Territory) and isolated in the Aru Islands. Its habitat is recorded as being damp, sandy soils in open Melaleuca viridiflora communities. It's been found in association with Drosera, Schoenus, and Utricularia species. S. pedunculatum is most closely associated with S. ericksoniae. Its conservation status has been assessed as data deficient.

== See also ==
- List of Stylidium species
