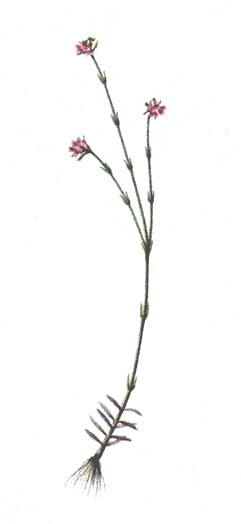
- Stylidium fissilobum

Scientific classification
- Kingdom: Plantae
- Clade: Tracheophytes
- Clade: Angiosperms
- Clade: Eudicots
- Clade: Asterids
- Order: Asterales
- Family: Stylidiaceae
- Genus: Stylidium
- Subgenus: Stylidium subg. Andersonia
- Section: Stylidium sect. Tenella (Benth.) A.R.Bean

Type species
- Stylidium tenellum Sw. ex Willd.

Species
- Stylidium aquaticum Stylidium capillare Stylidium confertum Stylidium diffusum Stylidium fissilobum Stylidium inconspicuum Stylidium longissimum Stylidium nominatum Stylidium oviflorum Stylidium prophyllum Stylidium tenellum

Synonyms
- Stylidium ser. Tenellae Benth. 1869

= Stylidium sect. Tenella =

Group of flowering plants

Stylidium section Tenella is a taxonomic rank in the plant kingdom under Stylidium subgenus Andersonia. In 2000, A.R. Bean published a taxonomic revision of subgenus Andersonia and established this section to separate these eleven species based on morphological and cladistic analysis. This taxonomic rank is named after George Bentham's series Tenellae, which he established in his 1869 treatment of the family Stylidiaceae. Series Tenellae was not used in Johannes Mildbraed's 1908 taxonomic monograph in which he completely revised the subgeneric taxonomy of the genus. Mildbraed's treatment of the genus taxonomy is the general demarcation which has been used in subsequent revisions and additions.

Species in this section have sessile leaves that are often minute, bract-like, and rarely form rosettes. Scapes are very short or mostly absent.

== See also ==
- List of Stylidium species
