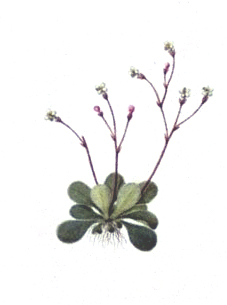
- Stylidium rotundifolium

Scientific classification
- Kingdom: Plantae
- Clade: Tracheophytes
- Clade: Angiosperms
- Clade: Eudicots
- Clade: Asterids
- Order: Asterales
- Family: Stylidiaceae
- Genus: Stylidium
- Subgenus: Stylidium subg. Andersonia
- Section: Stylidium sect. Biloba; A.R.Bean

Type species
- Stylidium rotundifolium R.Br.

Species
- Stylidium dunlopianum Stylidium fimbriatum Stylidium rotundifolium

= Stylidium sect. Biloba =

Group of flowering plants

Stylidium section Biloba is a taxonomic rank under Stylidium subgenus Andersonia. All the species in this section occur in northern Australia. In 2000, A.R. Bean published a taxonomic revision of subgenus Andersonia and established this section to separate these three species based on morphological and cladistic analysis. Species in this section form a basal rosette or cauline leaves and cymose inflorescences. The column is glabrous and dilated at the distal end.

== See also ==
- List of Stylidium species
