= Stylidium muscicola =

Scientific classification
- Kingdom: Plantae
- Clade: Tracheophytes
- Clade: Angiosperms
- Clade: Eudicots
- Clade: Asterids
- Order: Asterales
- Family: Stylidiaceae
- Genus: Stylidium
- Subgenus: Stylidium subg. Andersonia
- Section: Stylidium sect. Andersonia
- Species: S. muscicola

Binomial name
- Stylidium muscicola F.Muell. 1859

Synonyms
- Candollea muscicola (F.Muell.) F.Muell. 1883

Species of carnivorous plant

Stylidium muscicola is a dicotyledonous plant that belongs to the genus Stylidium (family Stylidiaceae) that was described by Ferdinand von Mueller in 1859. It is an erect annual plant that grows from 5 to 33 cm tall. Obovate or orbicular leaves, about 4-20 per plant, form terminal rosettes with some scattered along the stems. The leaves are generally 6–33 mm long and 5–28 mm wide. This species generally has one to eight scapes and cymose inflorescences that are 3–17 cm long. Flowers are white, pink, or mauve. S. muscicola's native range is concentrated in and around western Kimberley in Western Australia and extends to the northern parts of the Northern Territory and east almost to Queensland. Its typical habitat is a sheltered area along a sandstone ridge in sandy soils that remain moist in the dry seasons. It flowers in the Southern Hemisphere from February to September.

== See also ==
- List of Stylidium species
