= Calochilus psednus =

Cardwell beard orchid

Conservation status
- Endangered (EPBC Act)

Scientific classification
- Kingdom: Plantae
- Clade: Embryophytes
- Clade: Tracheophytes
- Clade: Spermatophytes
- Clade: Angiosperms
- Clade: Monocots
- Order: Asparagales
- Family: Orchidaceae
- Subfamily: Orchidoideae
- Tribe: Diurideae
- Genus: Calochilus
- Species: C. psednus

Binomial name
- Calochilus psednus D.L.Jones & Lavarack

Species of orchid

Calochilus psednus, commonly known as the Cardwell beard orchid, is a species of orchid endemic to Queensland. It has up to three bluish green flowers with reddish brown lines and a labellum with a purplish "beard". The plant is leafless when flowering. It is only known from a small area near Cardwell.

== Description ==
Calochilus psednus is a terrestrial, perennial, deciduous, herb with an underground tuber and a single dark green, grooved leaf 60–120 mm (2–5 in) long and 3–5 mm (0.12–0.20 in) wide. The leaf is not present during flowering. Up to three bluish green flowers with reddish brown lines, 11–13 mm (0.4–0.5 in) long and 7–9 mm (0.28–0.35 in) wide are borne on a thin, wiry flowering stem 250–350 mm (9.8–14 in) tall. The dorsal sepal is about 6 mm (0.2 in) long and 4 mm (0.2 in) wide and the lateral sepals are about 7 mm (0.3 in) long and 4 mm (0.2 in) wide. The petals are about 5 mm (0.2 in) long and 3 mm (0.1 in) wide. The labellum is flat, 10–11 mm (0.39–0.43 in) long and about 7 mm (0.3 in) wide and shiny reddish brown. Most of the labellum has well-spaced, short purple hairs apart from the last quarter which is hairless. The flowers appear from December to February but only last a few hours.

== Taxonomy and naming ==
Calochilus psednus was first formally described in 1989 by David Jones and Bill Lavarack and the description was published in Proceedings of the Royal Society of Queensland from specimens collected south of Cardwell. The specific epithet (psednus) is derived from the Ancient Greek word psednos meaning "thin", "scanty" or "bald".

== Distribution and habitat ==
The Cardwell beard orchid grows in broad-leafed paperbark woodland with dense shrubs and sedges and is only known from near the type location.

== Conservation ==
Calochilus psednus is classed as "endangered under the Nature Conservation Act 1992 and the Australian Government Environment Protection and Biodiversity Conservation Act 1999. The only threat to this orchid is its very limited distribution, although there are potential threats including changed fire regimes, weed invasion and road maintenance.
