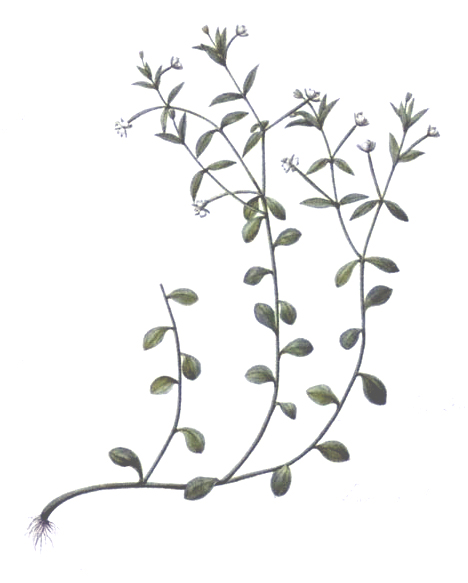
- Stylidium alsinoides

Scientific classification
- Kingdom: Plantae
- Clade: Tracheophytes
- Clade: Angiosperms
- Clade: Eudicots
- Clade: Asterids
- Order: Asterales
- Family: Stylidiaceae
- Genus: Stylidium
- Subgenus: Stylidium subg. Andersonia
- Section: Stylidium sect. Alsinoida (Mildbr.) A.R.Bean

Type species
- Stylidium alsinoides R.Br.

Species
- Stylidium alsinoides Stylidium cordifolium Stylidium fluminense Stylidium javanicum Stylidium tenerrimum

= Stylidium sect. Alsinoida =

Group of flowering plants

Stylidium section Alsinoida is a taxonomic rank under Stylidium subgenus Andersonia. In his 1908 monograph on the family Stylidiaceae, Johannes Mildbraed had established the subgenus Alsinoides for species related to S. alsinoides, which were morphologically similar to species of subgenus Andersonia. In 2000, A.R. Bean published a taxonomic revision of subgenus Andersonia and reduced subgenus Alsinoides to sectional rank, renamed Alsinoida.

== See also ==
- List of Stylidium species
