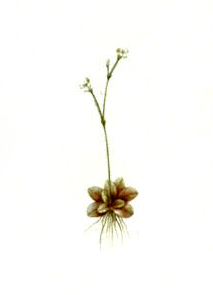
- Stylidium tenerum

Scientific classification
- Kingdom: Plantae
- Clade: Tracheophytes
- Clade: Angiosperms
- Clade: Eudicots
- Clade: Asterids
- Order: Asterales
- Family: Stylidiaceae
- Genus: Stylidium
- Subgenus: Stylidium subg. Andersonia
- Section: Stylidium sect. Andersonia; R.Br. ex G.Don

Species
- Stylidium accedens Stylidium candelabrum Stylidium divergens Stylidium ensatum Stylidium kunthii Stylidium lobuliflorum Stylidium muscicola Stylidium pachyrrhizum Stylidium schizanthum Stylidium simulans Stylidium stenophyllum Stylidium tenerum Stylidium uliginosum

= Stylidium sect. Andersonia =

Group of flowering plants

Stylidium section Andersonia is a taxonomic rank under Stylidium subgenus Andersonia. In 2000, A.R. Bean published a taxonomic revision of subgenus Andersonia and placed species within sections in the subgenus Andersonia, thus creating this autonym section. It contains 13 species. It is distinguished from the other sections in the subgenus by the inflorescences arising from leafless scapes, emerging from a basal or cauline cluster of broad leaves. The species in this section represent distributions from Southeast Asia, Malesia, tropical Australia, southern Queensland, and northern New South Wales.

== See also ==
- List of Stylidium species
