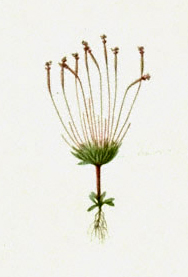

Scientific classification
- Kingdom: Plantae
- Clade: Tracheophytes
- Clade: Angiosperms
- Clade: Eudicots
- Clade: Asterids
- Order: Asterales
- Family: Stylidiaceae
- Genus: Stylidium
- Subgenus: Stylidium subg. Andersonia
- Section: Stylidium sect. Uniflora; A.R.Bean

Type species
- Stylidium pedunculatum R.Br.

Species
- Stylidium claytonioides Stylidium ericksoniae Stylidium pedunculatum Stylidium perizostera Stylidium trichopodum

= Stylidium sect. Uniflora =

Group of flowering plants

Stylidium section Uniflora is a taxonomic rank under Stylidium subgenus Andersonia. In 2000, A.R. Bean published a taxonomic revision of subgenus Andersonia and established this section to separate these five species based on morphological and cladistic analysis.

As the section epithet suggests, the most striking feature of the species in this taxonomic group are the solitary flowers on the scapes, a departure from the traditional form of most Stylidium species which have more than one flower per scape. Distribution is primarily in tropical Australia with one species, S. pedunculatum also being found on the Aru Islands.

== See also ==
- List of Stylidium species
