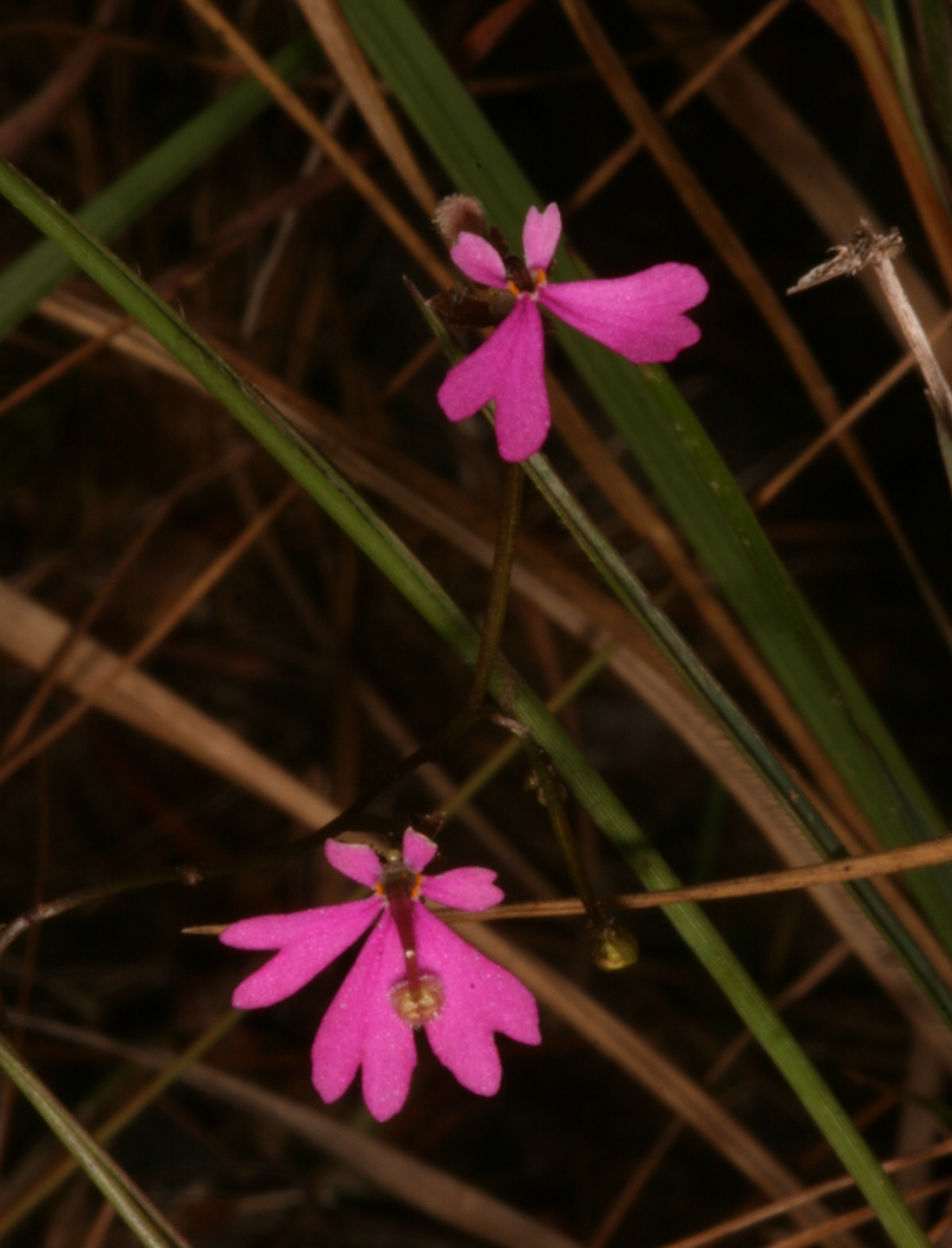
- Stylidium fissilobum in the Northern Territory, NT Herbarium

Scientific classification
- Kingdom: Plantae
- Clade: Tracheophytes
- Clade: Angiosperms
- Clade: Eudicots
- Clade: Asterids
- Order: Asterales
- Family: Stylidiaceae
- Genus: Stylidium
- Subgenus: Stylidium subg. Andersonia
- Section: Stylidium sect. Tenella
- Species: S. fissilobum

Binomial name
- Stylidium fissilobum F.Muell.

Synonyms
- Candollea fissiloba (F.Muell.) F.Muell.; Stylidium pseudotenellum O.Schwarz

= Stylidium fissilobum =

Species of carnivorous plant

Stylidium fissilobum is a dicotyledonous plant that belongs to the genus Stylidium (family Stylidiaceae).

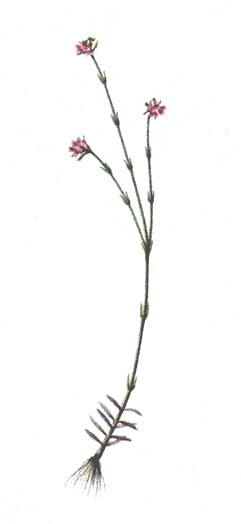
S. fissilobum drawing from the James Cook voyage in 1770.

It is an annual plant that grows from 5 to 50 cm tall. Linear or deltate leaves, about 4-34 per plant, are scattered along the elongate, glabrous stem. The leaves are generally 1–6 mm long and 0.3-0.7 mm wide. Petioles and scapes are absent. Inflorescences are 3–18 cm long. Flowers are pink, white, or mauve and bloom from March to July in the Southern Hemisphere.

S. fissilobum's wide distribution ranges across northern Australia from the western Kimberley region and Northern Territory eastward as far as Mount Surprise in Queensland. Its habitat is recorded as being wet sands at swamp edges in association with grasslands and sedgelands. Due to its weak stem, this species often threads its way through supporting branches and leaves of the dense grass and sedge cover. S. fissilobum is most closely related to S. aquaticum and S. oviflorum. Its conservation status has been assessed as data deficient.

== See also ==
- List of Stylidium species
