= Stylidium tenellum =

Scientific classification
- Kingdom: Plantae
- Clade: Tracheophytes
- Clade: Angiosperms
- Clade: Eudicots
- Clade: Asterids
- Order: Asterales
- Family: Stylidiaceae
- Genus: Stylidium
- Subgenus: Stylidium subg. Andersonia
- Section: Stylidium sect. Tenella
- Species: S. tenellum

Binomial name
- Stylidium tenellum Sw. ex Willd.

Synonyms
- Epilobium tonkinense H.Lév.; Stylidium roseum Kurz; Stylidium tenellum var. minimum C.B.Clarke

Species of carnivorous plant

Stylidium tenellum is a dicotyledonous plant that belongs to the genus Stylidium (family Stylidiaceae). It is an annual plant that grows from 5 to 27 cm tall. The obovate or elliptical leaves, about 6-14 per plant, are scattered along the elongate, glabrous stem and are generally 3.5-8.5 mm long and 0.8-2.5 mm wide. Scapes are absent. Inflorescences are 2–8 cm long and produce white, pink, or mauve flowers that bloom from September to December in their native range. S. tenellum is endemic to Southeast Asia and its distribution ranges from southern India to southern China and south to Sumatra. In China it's known from Guangdong, Yunnan, and southern Fujian provinces. Its habitat is recorded as being seasonal swamps and is often reported to grow near rice paddies. It is usually found growing at low altitudes but has been recorded from elevations as high as 1100 metres on Sumatra. S. tenellum is most closely related to S. diffusum.

The name Stylidium tenellum was also used by Robert Brown in 1810, unaware of the earlier use in 1805 by Olof Swartz. The species described by Brown is now known as S. tenerum.

== See also ==
- List of Stylidium species
