= Stylidium inconspicuum =

Scientific classification
- Kingdom: Plantae
- Clade: Tracheophytes
- Clade: Angiosperms
- Clade: Eudicots
- Clade: Asterids
- Order: Asterales
- Family: Stylidiaceae
- Genus: Stylidium
- Subgenus: Stylidium subg. Andersonia
- Section: Stylidium sect. Tenella
- Species: S. inconspicuum

Binomial name
- Stylidium inconspicuum Slooten

Species of carnivorous plant

Stylidium inconspicuum is a dicotyledonous plant that belongs to the genus Stylidium (family Stylidiaceae). It is an annual plant that grows from 5 to 20 cm tall. Obovate or elliptical leaves, about 5-30 per plant, are scattered along the elongate, glabrous stem. The leaves are generally 4–8 mm long and 2–5 mm wide. Petioles and scapes are absent. Inflorescences are 5–8 cm long and produce pink or red flowers. S. inconspicuum is endemic to Java and is one of the few Stylidium species that are not native to Australia. Its habitat is recorded as being moist areas in grass-dominated fields at an altitude of 20–30 metres.

== See also ==
- List of Stylidium species
