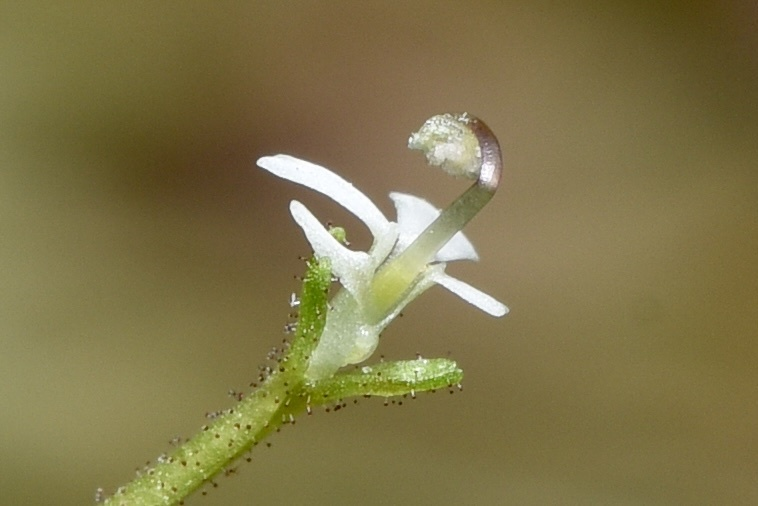

Scientific classification
- Kingdom: Plantae
- Clade: Tracheophytes
- Clade: Angiosperms
- Clade: Eudicots
- Clade: Asterids
- Order: Asterales
- Family: Stylidiaceae
- Genus: Stylidium
- Subgenus: Stylidium subg. Andersonia
- Section: Stylidium sect. Andersonia
- Species: S. uliginosum

Binomial name
- Stylidium uliginosum Sw. ex Willd.

Synonyms
- Candollea uliginosa (Sw. ex Willd.) F.Muell.; Stylidium brunonis Griff.; Stylidium kunthii Wall. ex DC.; Stylidium sinicum Hance

= Stylidium uliginosum =

Species of carnivorous plant

Stylidium uliginosum is a dicotyledonous species of plant in the family Stylidiaceae and is one of the few species in the genus that is not native to Australia.

== Description ==
It is an erect annual plant that grows from 4 to 20 cm tall. Obovate, orbicular or elliptical leaves, about 5-16 per plant, form basal or terminal rosettes with some scattered along compressed stems. The leaves are generally 4.5–15 mm long and 2–9 mm wide. This species generally has one to seven scapes and cymose inflorescences that are 4–15 cm long. Flowers are white or pink.

== Distribution and habitat ==
Stylidium uliginosum is endemic to Southeast Asia and has a wide distribution, ranging from eastern India and Indochina to Guangdong province in southern China. The type location is in Sri Lanka, but it may now be extirpated from that location. Earlier reports list this species as also occurring in Queensland and other parts of Australia, but this was before subsequent revisions revealed those occurrences in Australia were really a different species, S. tenerum, that resembled S. uliginosum. Its typical habitats include wet soils of rice fields, sandy, moist soils in open savannah, and natural grasslands. It flowers from October to March. S. uliginosum is most closely related to S. kunthii and S. tenerum.

== See also ==
- List of Stylidium species
