= Sachin Anil Punekar =

Insian scientist

Sachin Anil Punekar is an Indian botanist and ornithologist and founder President of Biospheres, a non-government organisation working for conservation of biodiversity. He has so far described more than 20 new plant taxa to the science. He did his PhD on 'Flora of Anshi National Park, Karnataka State' from Botanical Survey of India. He is working at Agharkar Research Institute, Pune.

== Publications ==
- Sachin A. Punekar, P. Lakshminarasimhan. Flora Of Anshi National Park, Western Ghats Karnataka. Biospheres Publication. p. 798.
