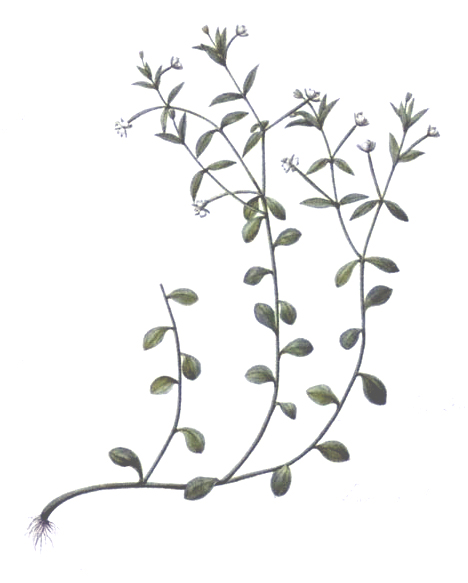
- Drawing from the 1770 voyage of James Cook

Conservation status
- Special Least Concern (NCA)

Scientific classification
- Kingdom: Plantae
- Clade: Tracheophytes
- Clade: Angiosperms
- Clade: Eudicots
- Clade: Asterids
- Order: Asterales
- Family: Stylidiaceae
- Genus: Stylidium
- Subgenus: Stylidium subg. Andersonia
- Section: Stylidium sect. Alsinoida
- Species: S. alsinoides

Binomial name
- Stylidium alsinoides R.Br.

Synonyms
- Candollea alsinoides (R.Br.) F.Muell.; Stylidium alsinoides var. cordifolium Ewart, Jean White & B.Wood; Stylidium mitrasacmoides F.Muell.

= Stylidium alsinoides =

Species of carnivorous plant

Stylidium alsinoides is a dicotyledonous plant that belongs to the family Stylidiaceae. It is an erect annual plant that grows from 18 to 30 cm (7.1 to 11.8 in) tall. Obovate or elliptical leaves, about 20–100 per plant, are scattered along the elongate, glabrous stems. The leaves are generally 5.5–14 mm (0.22–0.55 in) long and 3–8 mm (0.12–0.31 in) wide. The bracts on the inflorescence can be as large as leaves and may be hard to distinguish them except for their growth habit: the leaves are alternate whereas the bracts are opposite.

This species lacks a scape. Inflorescences are 5–15 cm (2.0–5.9 in) long and produce white flowers that bloom from April to September in Australia but occur year-round in Malesia. S. alsinoides's distribution ranges from northern Queensland in Australia north to the island of Luzon in the Philippines and southern parts of Sulawesi in New Guinea. In Australia its typical habitat has been reported as a sandy soil in swamps that are dominated by Melaleuca quinquenervia, but has also been found on creekbanks with Melaleuca leucadendra or in some of the wetter rock crevices. S. alsinoides is most closely related to S. fluminense.

This species is listed as "special least-concern" under the Queensland Government's Nature Conservation Act, a classification unique to Queensland and which lies between least concern and near threatened. As of June 2024, it has not been assessed by the International Union for Conservation of Nature (IUCN).

== See also ==
- List of Stylidium species
