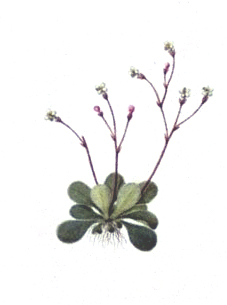
- Stylidium rotundifolium

Scientific classification
- Kingdom: Plantae
- Clade: Tracheophytes
- Clade: Angiosperms
- Clade: Eudicots
- Clade: Asterids
- Order: Asterales
- Family: Stylidiaceae
- Genus: Stylidium
- Subgenus: Stylidium subg. Andersonia (R.Br.) Mildbr.

Type species
- Stylidium tenellum R.Br.

Sections
- Alsinoida; Andersonia; Biloba; Tenella; Uniflora

= Stylidium subg. Andersonia =

Subgenus of flowering plants

Andersonia is a subgenus of Stylidium that is characterized by a linear hypanthium, recurved mature capsule walls, an erect and persistent septum, and many seeds. This subgenus occurs in areas of tropical northern Australia and into Southeast Asia and was named in honour of William Anderson, the surgeon and naturalist who sailed with James Cook.

== Taxonomy ==
In his 1908 monograph, Johannes Mildbraed had treated subgenus Andersonia as a rank without sections. He also had established the subgenus Alsinoides for species related to S. alsinoides, which are morphologically similar to species of subgenus Andersonia. In 2000, A.R. Bean published a taxonomic revision of subgenus Andersonia and reduced subgenus Alsinoides to sectional rank, renamed Alsinoida. Bean also established three other new sections based on cladistic analysis: Biloba, Uniflora, and Tenella, which is really just George Bentham's series Tenellae, though heavily revised. By adding sectional ranks to subgenus Andersonia, Bean also established the autonym section Andersonia.

In 2010, Sachin A. Punekar and P. Lakshminarasimhan published the new species S. darwinii from Western Ghats of Karnataka, India. They placed it in subgenus Andersonia and mentioned it was closely allied with S. kunthii, S. inconspicuum, and S. tenellum, but they did not place it within a section. Also in 2010, botanist A. R. Bean described three new Australian species from the Northern Territory (S. exiguum, S. notabile, and S. osculum) that belong to subgenus Andersonia, but he did not place them within a section.

== See also ==
- List of Stylidium species
