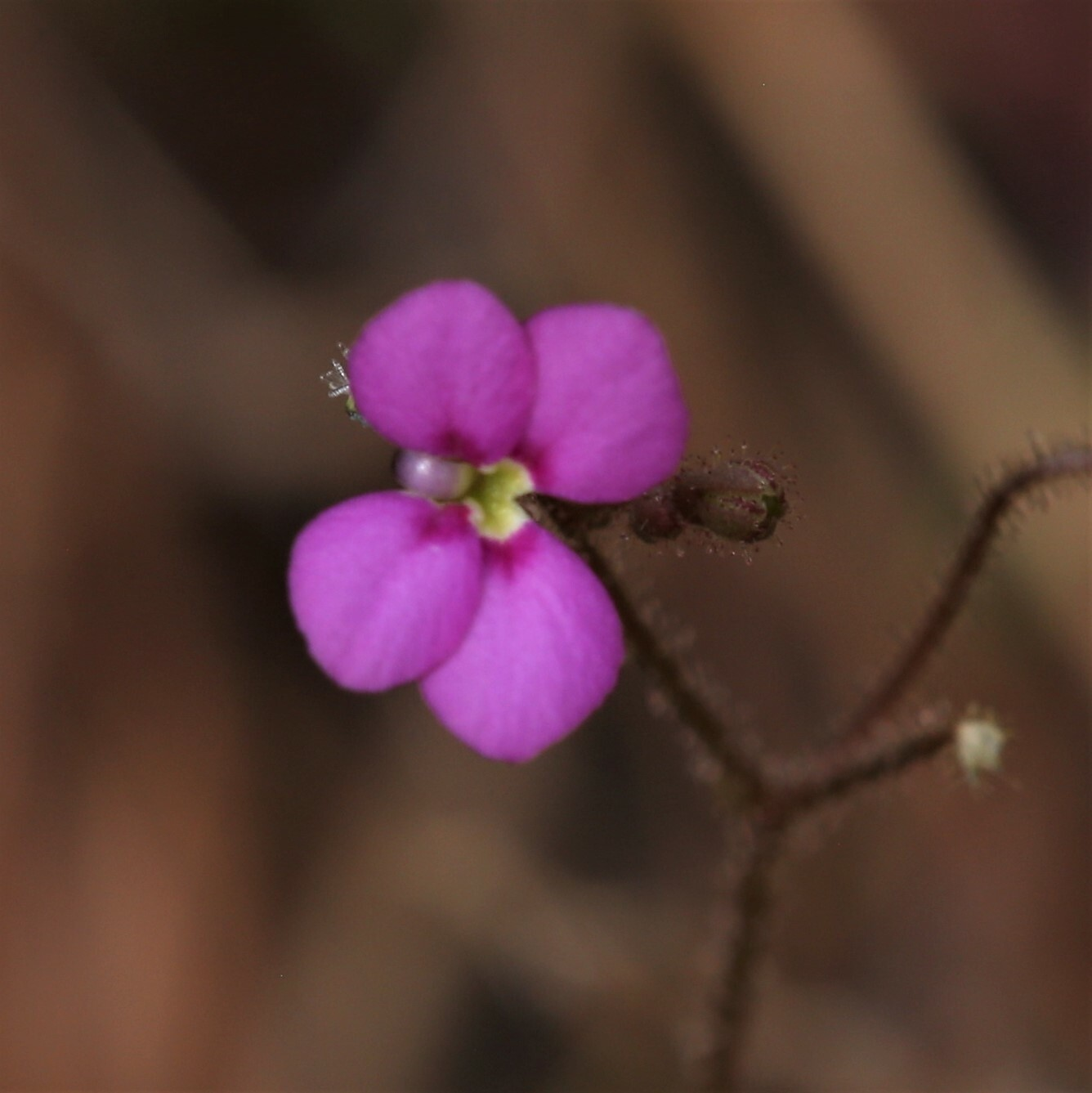

Scientific classification
- Kingdom: Plantae
- Clade: Tracheophytes
- Clade: Angiosperms
- Clade: Eudicots
- Clade: Asterids
- Order: Asterales
- Family: Stylidiaceae
- Genus: Stylidium
- Subgenus: Stylidium subg. Tolypangium
- Section: Stylidium sect. Debilia
- Species: S. austrocapense

Binomial name
- Stylidium austrocapense A.R.Bean

= Stylidium austrocapense =

Species of carnivorous plant

Stylidium austrocapense is a dicotyledonous plant in the family Stylidiaceae. The specific epithet austrocapense refers to this species' native range on the southern part of Cape York Peninsula in Australia. It is an herbaceous annual plant that grows from 9 to 18 cm tall. Oblanceolate or elliptical leaves, about 4-40 per plant, form a basal rosette with stems absent. The leaves are generally 7.5–31 mm long and 2–10 mm wide. This species produces 1-10 scapes per plant that are glandular-hairy. Inflorescences are 9–18 cm long and produce pink or red flowers that bloom from April to July in their native range. S. austrocapense is endemic to the Cape York Peninsula in Queensland, Australia. Its typical habitat has been reported as coarse white sandy soils on low hills or intermittent watercourses. Dominant vegetation in association with its habitat include Eucalyptus tetrodonta, E. clarksoniana, Melaleuca viridiflora, M. nervosa, and Xanthorrhoea johnsonii. S. austrocapense is most closely related to S. multiscapum, but differs by the shorter leaves and absent paracorolla. Its conservation status has been assessed as secure.

== See also ==
- List of Stylidium species
