= Stylidium inaequipetalum =

Scientific classification
- Kingdom: Plantae
- Clade: Tracheophytes
- Clade: Angiosperms
- Clade: Eudicots
- Clade: Asterids
- Order: Asterales
- Family: Stylidiaceae
- Genus: Stylidium
- Subgenus: Stylidium subg. Tolypangium
- Section: Stylidium sect. Debilia
- Species: S. inaequipetalum

Binomial name
- Stylidium inaequipetalum J.M.Black

Species of carnivorous plant

Stylidium inaequipetalum, the Ayers Rock triggerplant, is a small herbaceous perennial plant in the genus Stylidium. It grows from 7 to 40 cm (2.8 to 15.7 in) tall. Oblanceolate leaves, about 20-100 per plant, form a basal rosette with stems absent. The leaves are generally 15–81 mm long and 2–8 mm wide. This species produces 1-11 scapes per plant. Inflorescences are 7–40 cm long and produce pink flowers with petals all free and blooms almost year-round in their native range. S. inaequipetalum is endemic to the southwestern Northern Territory and Western Australia. Its typical habitat has been reported as sandy soils on sheltered creekbanks or in between rocks. S. inaequipetalum is most closely related to S. floribundum, though it is also closely allied with S. debile.

It was first described by John McConnell Black in a 1938 issue of the Transactions of the Royal Society of South Australia.

== See also ==
- List of Stylidium species
