= Stylidium ornatum =

Scientific classification
- Kingdom: Plantae
- Clade: Tracheophytes
- Clade: Angiosperms
- Clade: Eudicots
- Clade: Asterids
- Order: Asterales
- Family: Stylidiaceae
- Genus: Stylidium
- Subgenus: Stylidium subg. Tolypangium
- Section: Stylidium sect. Debilia
- Species: S. ornatum

Binomial name
- Stylidium ornatum S.T.Blake

Species of carnivorous plant

Stylidium ornatum is a dicotyledonous plant that belongs to the genus Stylidium (family Stylidiaceae). It is an herbaceous annual or perennial that grows from 10 to 30 cm tall. Oblanceolate leaves, about 5-25 per plant, form either a basal rosette with stems absent or in terminal rosettes when plant stems are present. The leaves are generally 13–37 mm long and 3–10 mm wide. This species produces 1-4 scapes per plant. Inflorescences are 12–30 cm long and produce pink flowers that bloom all year in their native range. S. ornatum is endemic to Queensland and New South Wales. Its typical habitat has been reported as sandy soils in heathland or "wallum" on waterlogged coastal sands. S. ornatum is closely related to S. debile. Its conservation status has been assessed as secure.

== See also ==
- List of Stylidium species
