= Stylidium sect. Lanata =

Scientific classification
- Kingdom: Plantae
- Clade: Tracheophytes
- Clade: Angiosperms
- Clade: Eudicots
- Clade: Asterids
- Order: Asterales
- Family: Stylidiaceae
- Genus: Stylidium
- Subgenus: Stylidium subg. Tolypangium
- Section: Stylidium sect. Lanata; A.R.Bean

Type species
- Stylidium eriorhizum R.Br.

Species
- Stylidium eriorhizum; Stylidium leiophyllum; Stylidium ramosissimum

Group of carnivorous plants

Stylidium section Lanata is a taxonomic rank under Stylidium subgenus Tolypangium. It was described in 1999 by Anthony Bean. Two of the species in the section were also described by Bean in 1999, but S. eriorhizum was moved from section Debilia to section Lanata. The three species differ from those of section Debilia by their perennial habit, thickened woolly plant bases, indeterminate central rachis of the inflorescence, and larger, spherical seeds that possess a small nipple.

All species in this section are endemic to Queensland, Australia.

== See also ==
- List of Stylidium species
