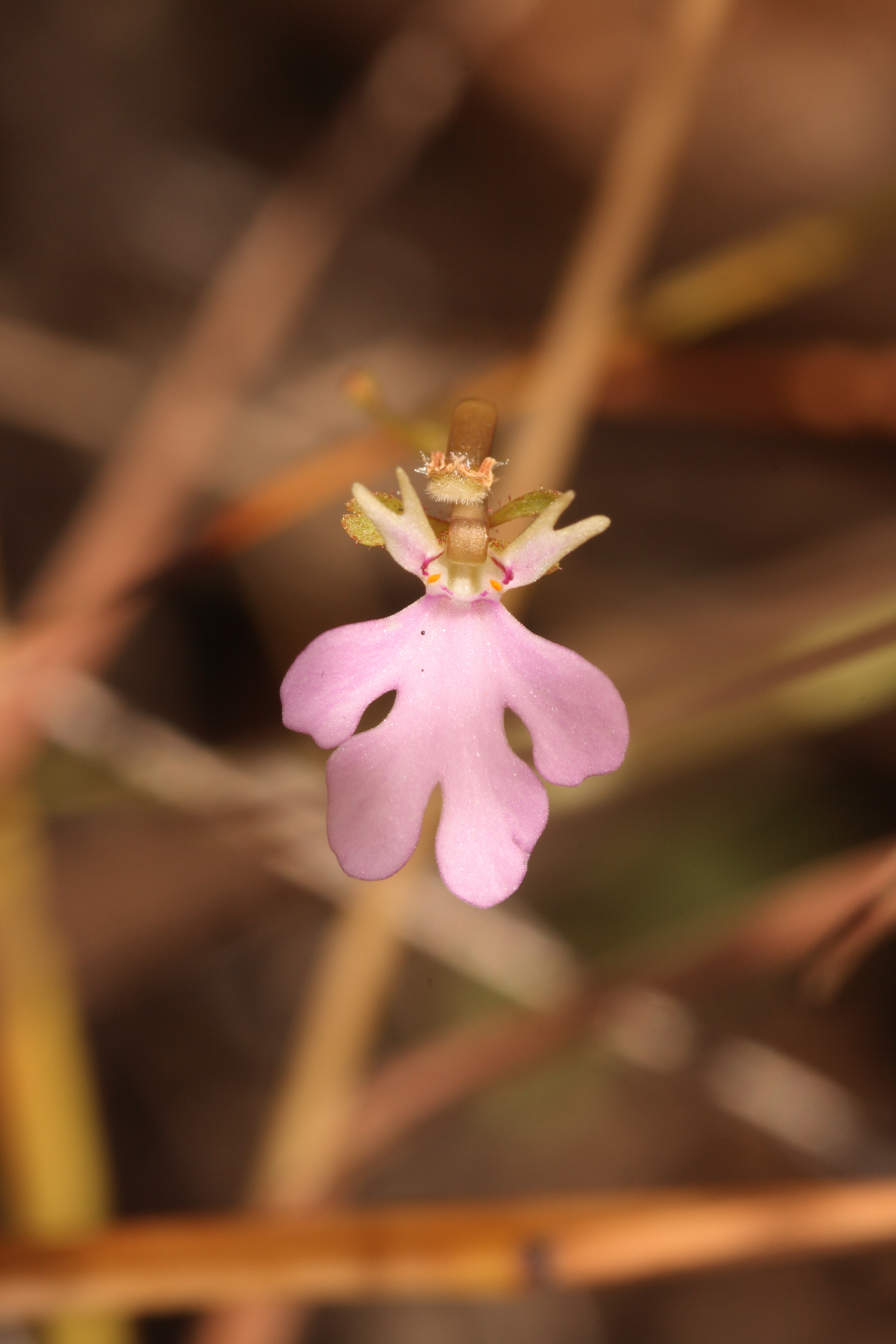

Scientific classification
- Kingdom: Plantae
- Clade: Tracheophytes
- Clade: Angiosperms
- Clade: Eudicots
- Clade: Asterids
- Order: Asterales
- Family: Stylidiaceae
- Genus: Stylidium
- Subgenus: Stylidium subg. Tolypangium
- Section: Stylidium sect. Debilia
- Species: S. semipartitum

Binomial name
- Stylidium semipartitum F.Muell. 1859

Synonyms
- S. leptorrhizum var. pilosum Benth. 1868 S. leptorrhizum auct. non F.Muell.

= Stylidium semipartitum =

Species of carnivorous plant

Stylidium semipartitum is a dicotyledonous plant that belongs to the genus Stylidium (family Stylidiaceae). It is an herbaceous annual or perennial that grows from 9 to 40 cm tall. Oblanceolate, elliptical, or obovate leaves, about 10-30 per plant, form a terminal rosette with stems present and glandular-hairy. The glandular-hairy leaves are generally 11–68 mm long and 3–21 mm wide. This species produces 1-18 scapes per plant. Inflorescences are 8–30 cm long and produce pink, mauve, or red flowers that bloom from March to August in their native range. S. semipartitum is endemic to the Kimberley region of Western Australia and northern parts of the Northern Territory. Its typical habitat has been reported as either damp sandy soils in eucalypt woodlands, near creeks in the company of Melaleuca species or on sandstone plateaux with Triodia species. S. semipartitum is distinct within section Debilia because it possesses glandular-hairy leaves. Other than that distinctive feature, however, it resembles descriptions of S. leptorrhizum, which is why George Bentham reduced S. semipartitum to a synonym of S. leptorrhizum.

== See also ==
- List of Stylidium species
