= Stylidium sect. Repentes =

Scientific classification
- Kingdom: Plantae
- Clade: Tracheophytes
- Clade: Angiosperms
- Clade: Eudicots
- Clade: Asterids
- Order: Asterales
- Family: Stylidiaceae
- Genus: Stylidium
- Subgenus: Stylidium subg. Tolypangium
- Section: Stylidium sect. Repentes; Mildbr.

Species
- Stylidium diplectroglossum Stylidium flagellum Stylidium perula Stylidium pingrupense Stylidium pseudosacculatum Stylidium repens Stylidium sacculatum Stylidium thylax

Group of flowering plants

Repentes is a section in the subgenus Tolypangium (genus Stylidium). Repentes is a group of creeping triggerplants known as the locket triggerplants, related to subgenus Nitrangium section Appressae. They possess adpressed stem leaves bearing a small basal spur and uni-flowered inflorescences. Because section Repentes morphologically resembles the other creeping triggerplants in section Appressae, Allen Lowrie et al. (1999) proposed all species in this section be moved to section Appressae and Repentes be placed into synonymy. Juliet Wege (2006), however, argued that these species are morphologically distinct from those in section Appressae, citing trichome and column cunabulum structure as distinctions that separate the sections.
