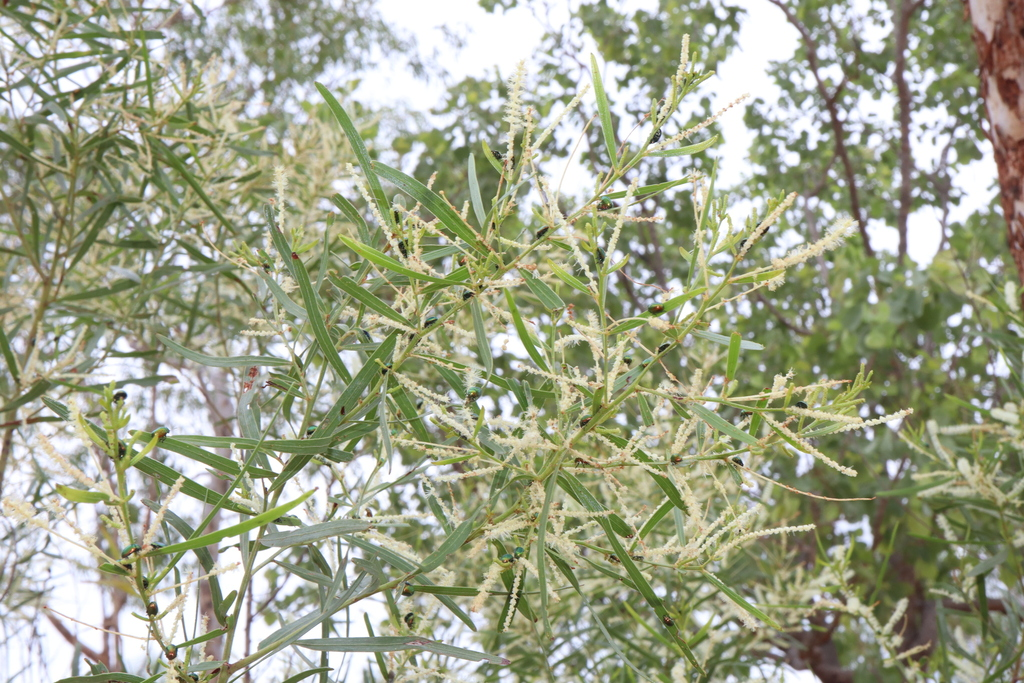
- In Kakadu National Park

Scientific classification
- Kingdom: Plantae
- Clade: Tracheophytes
- Clade: Angiosperms
- Clade: Eudicots
- Clade: Rosids
- Order: Fabales
- Family: Fabaceae
- Subfamily: Caesalpinioideae
- Clade: Mimosoid clade
- Genus: Acacia
- Species: A. gonocarpa

Binomial name
- Acacia gonocarpa F.Muell.
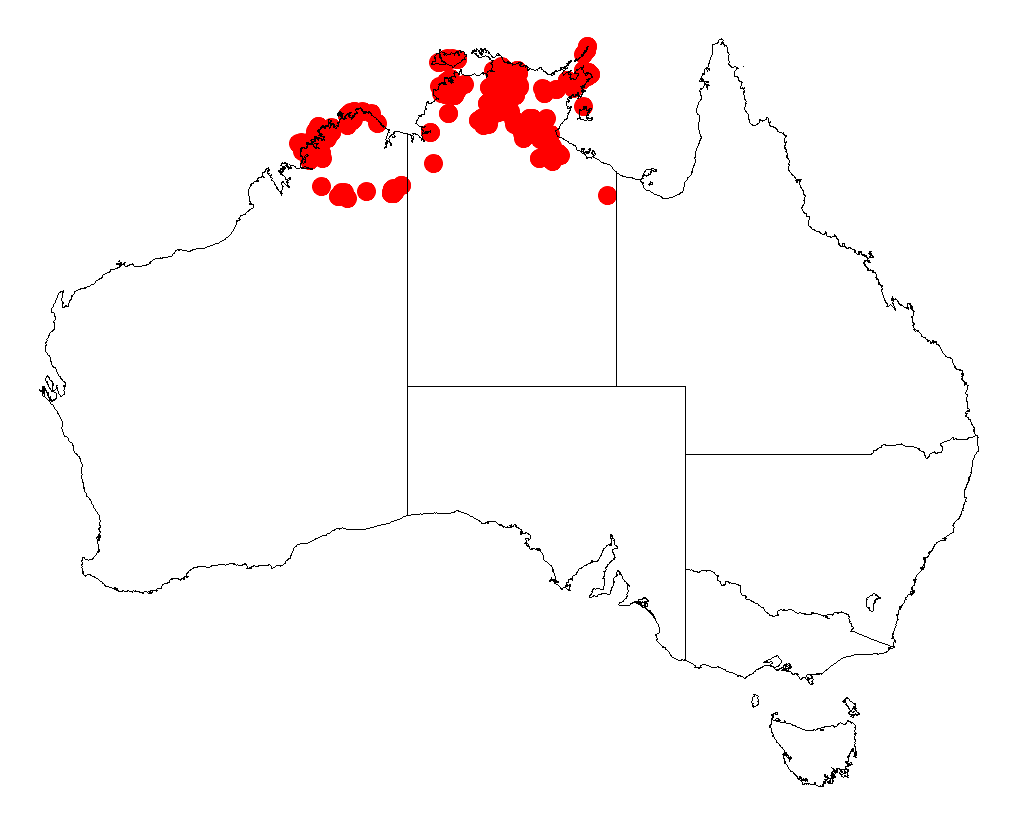
- Occurrence data from AVH

Synonyms
- Acacia gonocarpa F.Muell. var. gonocarpa; Racosperma gonocarpum (F.Muell.) Pedley

= Acacia gonocarpa =

Wuluru

Species of legume

Acacia gonocarpa commonly known as wuluru, is a species of flowering plant in the family Fabaceae and is endemic to northern Australia. It is an erect, many-stemmed, spindly or spreading shrub or tree, with linear to narrowly elliptic phyllodes, spikes of pale yellow or cream-coloured flowers and more or less woody, dark brown pods.

== Description ==
Acacia gonocarpa is an erect shrub that typically grows to a height of up to 2 m (6 ft 7 in), sometimes a tree to 3 m (9.8 ft), and is spindly or spreading with many stems, often with drooping branches and a sparse canopy. Its bark is smooth but finely fissured at the base. The phyllodes are linear to narrowly elliptic, 50–120 mm (2.0–4.7 in) long and 0.7–1.8 mm (0.028–0.071 in) wide, sometimes in groups of two or three, each with a prominent midvein. There are linear, white stipules 0.4–0.7 mm (0.016–0.028 in) at the base of the phyllodes. The flowers are pale yellow to cream-coloured and borne in up to three spikes up to 30 mm (1.2 in) long in axils. Flowering occurs from October to February, and the pods are straight or curved, 20–85 mm (0.79–3.35 in) long and 3–6 mm (0.12–0.24 in) wide, more or less woody and dark brown with wings 2–4.5 mm (0.079–0.177 in) wide and often convoluted. The seeds are brown with a conical aril.

== Taxonomy ==
Acacia gonocarpa was first formally described in 1859 by the botanist Ferdinand von Mueller in the Journal of the Proceedings of the Linnean Society, Botany. The specific epithet (gonocarpa) means 'angle-fruited'.

== Distribution ==
Wuluru is found in the Kimberley region of Western Australia and the Top End of the Northern Territory. It grows in woodland, sometimes with Melaleuca nervosa, on the top of sandstone escarpments or on the lower slopes of alluvial fans, on sandy, gravelly soil.

== Conservation status ==
Acacia gonocarpa is listed as "not threatened" by the Government of Western Australia Department of Biodiversity, Conservation and Attractions, and as of "least concern" under the Northern Territory Government Territory Parks and Wildlife Conservation Act.

== See also ==
- List of Acacia species
