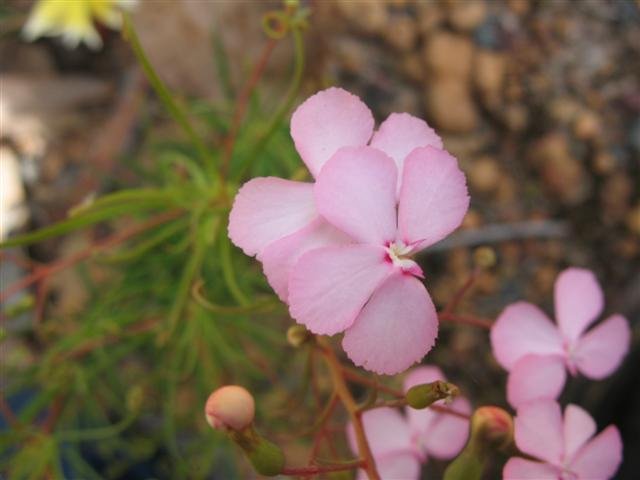

Scientific classification
- Kingdom: Plantae
- Clade: Tracheophytes
- Clade: Angiosperms
- Clade: Eudicots
- Clade: Asterids
- Order: Asterales
- Family: Stylidiaceae
- Genus: Stylidium
- Subgenus: Stylidium subg. Tolypangium
- Section: Stylidium sect. Verticillatae
- Species: S. scandens

Binomial name
- Stylidium scandens R.Br., 1831

= Stylidium scandens =

Species of carnivorous plant

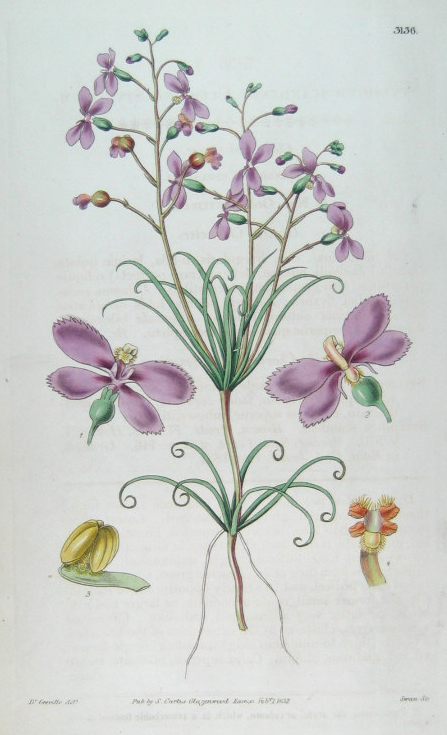
Curtis's Botanical Magazine print of Stylidium scandens.

Stylidium scandens (the climbing triggerplant) is a dicotyledonous plant that belongs to the genus Stylidium (family Stylidiaceae). S. scandens is endemic to Australia and is found primarily in the southwestern region of Western Australia. This species, along with Stylidium nymphaeum, has a unique characteristic among triggerplants in that its leaves, five centimetres (two inches) long, end in a recurved barb that can grab hold of other vegetation and scramble or climb up to 30–60 cm in height over other plants, which is how it obtained its common name. Its flowers are bright pink and about 15 mm wide.

== See also ==
- List of Stylidium species
