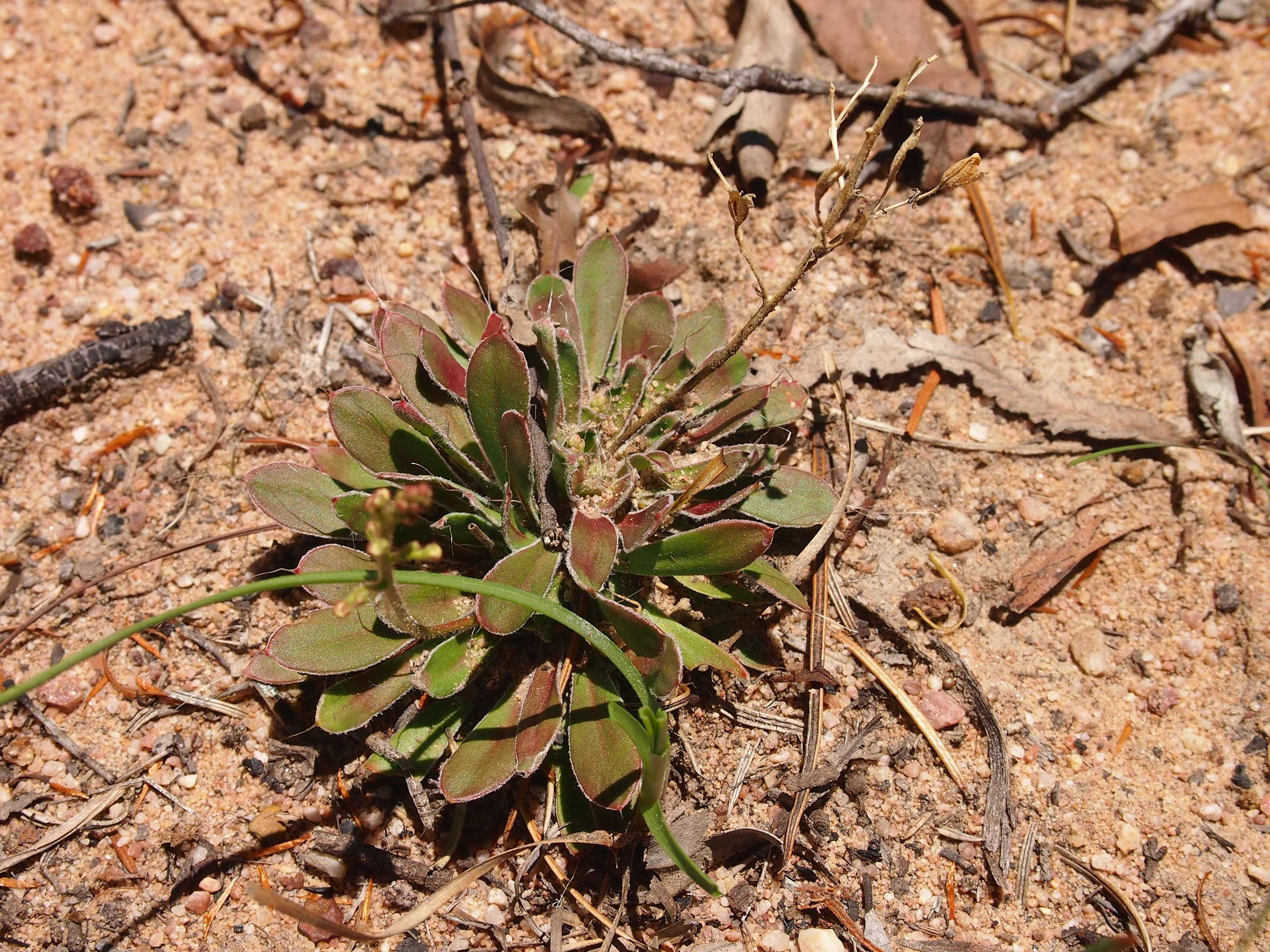

Scientific classification
- Kingdom: Plantae
- Clade: Tracheophytes
- Clade: Angiosperms
- Clade: Eudicots
- Clade: Asterids
- Order: Asterales
- Family: Stylidiaceae
- Genus: Stylidium
- Subgenus: Stylidium subg. Tolypangium
- Section: Stylidium sect. Lanata
- Species: S. eriorhizum

Binomial name
- Stylidium eriorhizum R.Br. 1810

Synonyms
- Candollea eriorhiza (R.Br.) F.Muell. 1883

= Stylidium eriorhizum =

Species of carnivorous plant

Stylidium eriorhizum is a species that belongs to the genus Stylidium (family Stylidiaceae). It is an herbaceous perennial plant that grows from 12 to 25 cm tall. Spathulate to oblanceolate leaves, about 20-100 per plant, form a basal rosette with stems greatly reduced. The leaves are generally 20–60 mm long and 4–10 mm wide. This species produces 1-3 scapes per plant. Inflorescences are 10–23 cm long and produce pink to white flowers that bloom year-round in their native range. S. eriorhizum is endemic to Queensland, where it is widespread from Atherton in the north to Barakula State Forest near Chinchilla in the south. Its typical habitat has been reported as sandy soils in woodlands or heathlands.

== See also ==
- List of Stylidium species
