= Stylidium floribundum =

Scientific classification
- Kingdom: Plantae
- Clade: Tracheophytes
- Clade: Angiosperms
- Clade: Eudicots
- Clade: Asterids
- Order: Asterales
- Family: Stylidiaceae
- Genus: Stylidium
- Subgenus: Stylidium subg. Tolypangium
- Section: Stylidium sect. Debilia
- Species: S. floribundum

Binomial name
- Stylidium floribundum R.Br. 1810

Synonyms
- Candollea floribunda (R.Br.) F.Muell. 1883

Species of carnivorous plant

Stylidium floribundum is a dicotyledonous plant that belongs to the genus Stylidium (family Stylidiaceae). S. floribundum's distribution ranges from the Kimberley region of Western Australia across northern Australia to northwestern Queensland.

It is an herbaceous annual plant that grows from 7 to 18 cm tall. Oblanceolate or obovate leaves, about 6-30 per plant, form a basal rosette with stems absent. The leaves are generally 8–48 mm long and 4–11 mm wide. This species produces 1-20 scapes per plant. Inflorescences are 7–18 cm long and produce pink or yellow flowers that bloom from May to September in their native range.

Its typical habitat has been reported as sandy soils on swampy flats or creekbeds. Dominant vegetation in association with its habitat include Melaleuca or Eucalyptus species. S. floribundum is most closely related to S. inaequipetalum.

== See also ==
- List of Stylidium species
