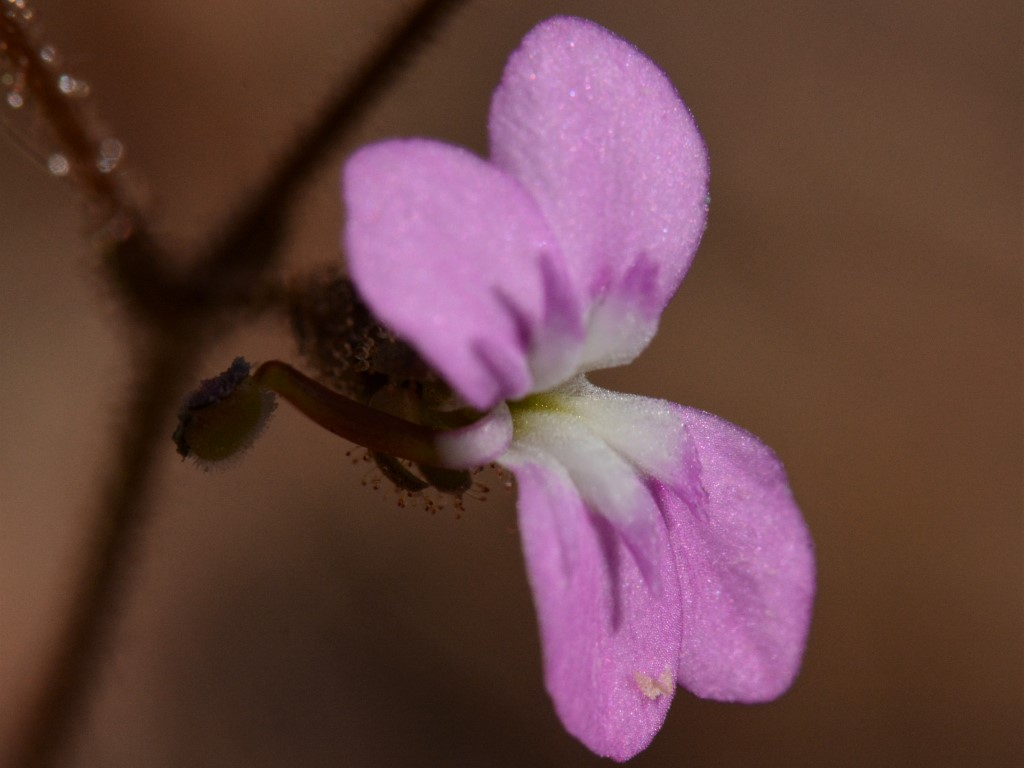

Scientific classification
- Kingdom: Plantae
- Clade: Tracheophytes
- Clade: Angiosperms
- Clade: Eudicots
- Clade: Asterids
- Order: Asterales
- Family: Stylidiaceae
- Genus: Stylidium
- Subgenus: Stylidium subg. Tolypangium
- Section: Stylidium sect. Debilia
- Species: S. multiscapum

Binomial name
- Stylidium multiscapum O.Schwarz 1927

= Stylidium multiscapum =

Species of carnivorous plant

Stylidium multiscapum is a dicotyledonous plant that belongs to the genus Stylidium (family Stylidiaceae). It is an herbaceous annual plant that grows from 10 to 20 cm tall. Oblanceolate leaves, about 8-100 per plant, form a basal rosette with stems absent.

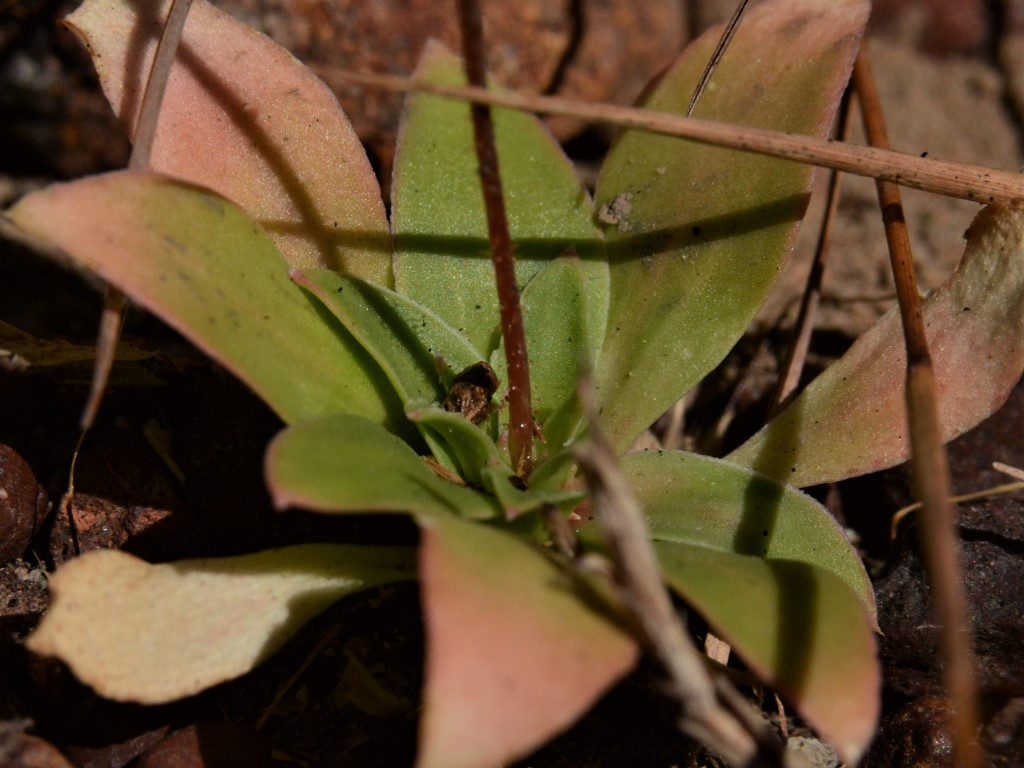

The leaves are generally 22–52 mm long and 6.5–8 mm wide. This species produces 1-8 scapes per plant. Inflorescences are 10–20 cm long and produce pink flowers that bloom from May to October in their native range.

S. multiscapum's distributions ranges from the eastern Kimberley region of Western Australia through the northern parts of the Northern Territory and into northwestern Queensland. Its typical habitat has been reported as damp sandy soils near creeks or swamps in Eucalyptus-dominated woodlands. S. multiscapum is closely related to S. leptorrhizum.

== See also ==
- List of Stylidium species
