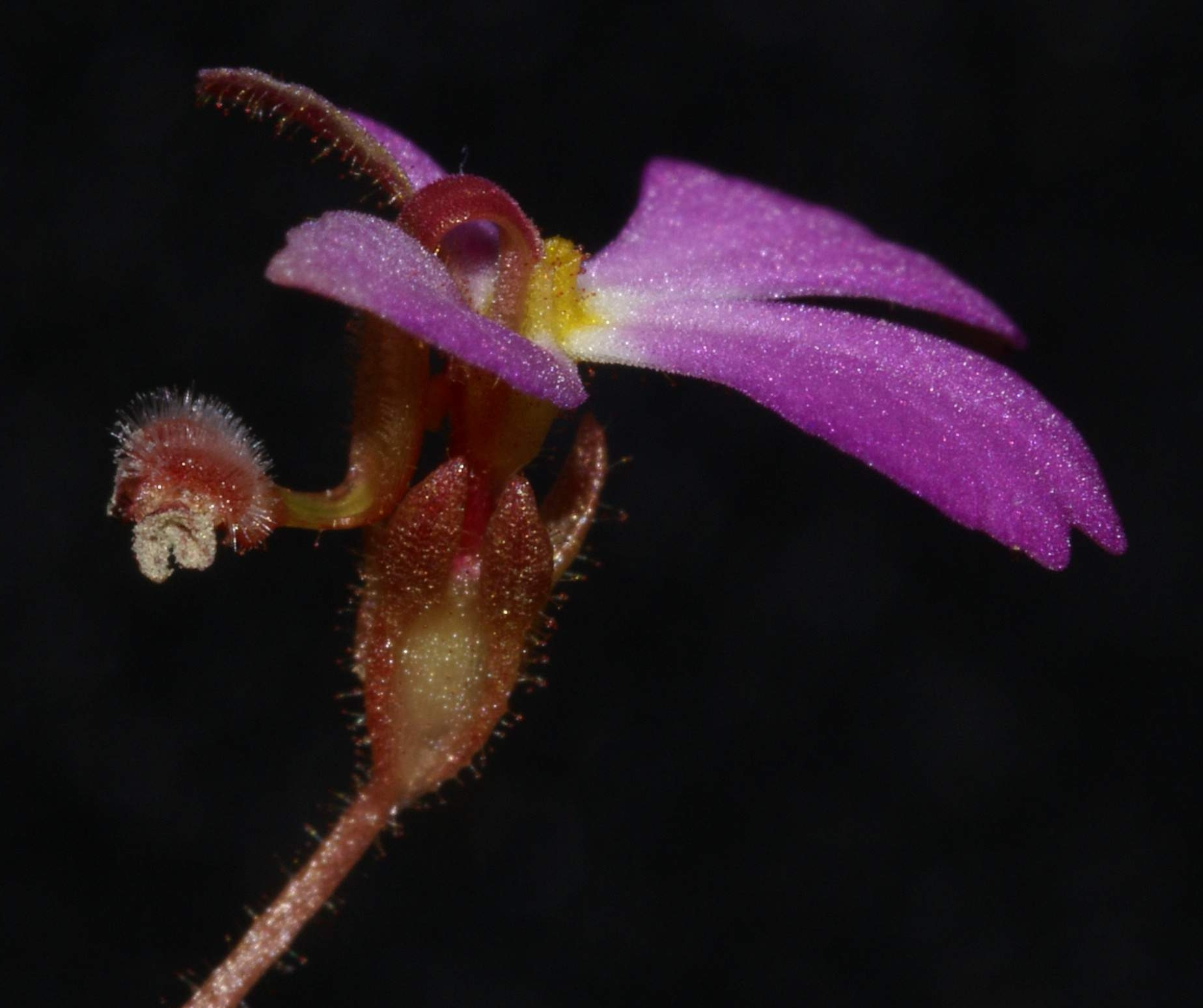
- Stylidium turbinatum flower

Scientific classification
- Kingdom: Plantae
- Clade: Tracheophytes
- Clade: Angiosperms
- Clade: Eudicots
- Clade: Asterids
- Order: Asterales
- Family: Stylidiaceae
- Genus: Stylidium
- Subgenus: Stylidium subg. Tolypangium
- Section: Stylidium sect. Floodia
- Species: S. turbinatum

Binomial name
- Stylidium turbinatum Lowrie & Kenneally

= Stylidium turbinatum =

Species of carnivorous plant

Stylidium turbinatum is a dicotyledonous plant that belongs to the genus Stylidium (family Stylidiaceae). S. turbinatum is endemic to Australia and is found in the northern part of Western Australia in the Kimberley region and near Darwin in the Northern Territory. This species is an erect annual herb that stands 6–15 cm tall. A 2–5 cm long stem bearing scattered leaves terminate in a tuft of 1–2 cm long upper leaves. Several scapes appear from these terminal tufts. The inflorescence is a raceme, which produces pink flowers whose petals are vertically paired. The hypanthium of this species is turbinate and is one of the distinguishing characteristics used to identify it. The sepals form ribs around the hypanthium, giving it a turbine-like appearance. Seeds of S. turbinatum are pale orange and around 0.2 mm long. S. turbinatum was first formally described by Allen Lowrie and Kevin F. Kenneally in 1997, with most specimens having been collected and examined in the mid-1990s with one early specimen from 1990. S. turbinatum grows in sandy soils at the margins of creeks and floodways and is closely associated with wet season herb fields.

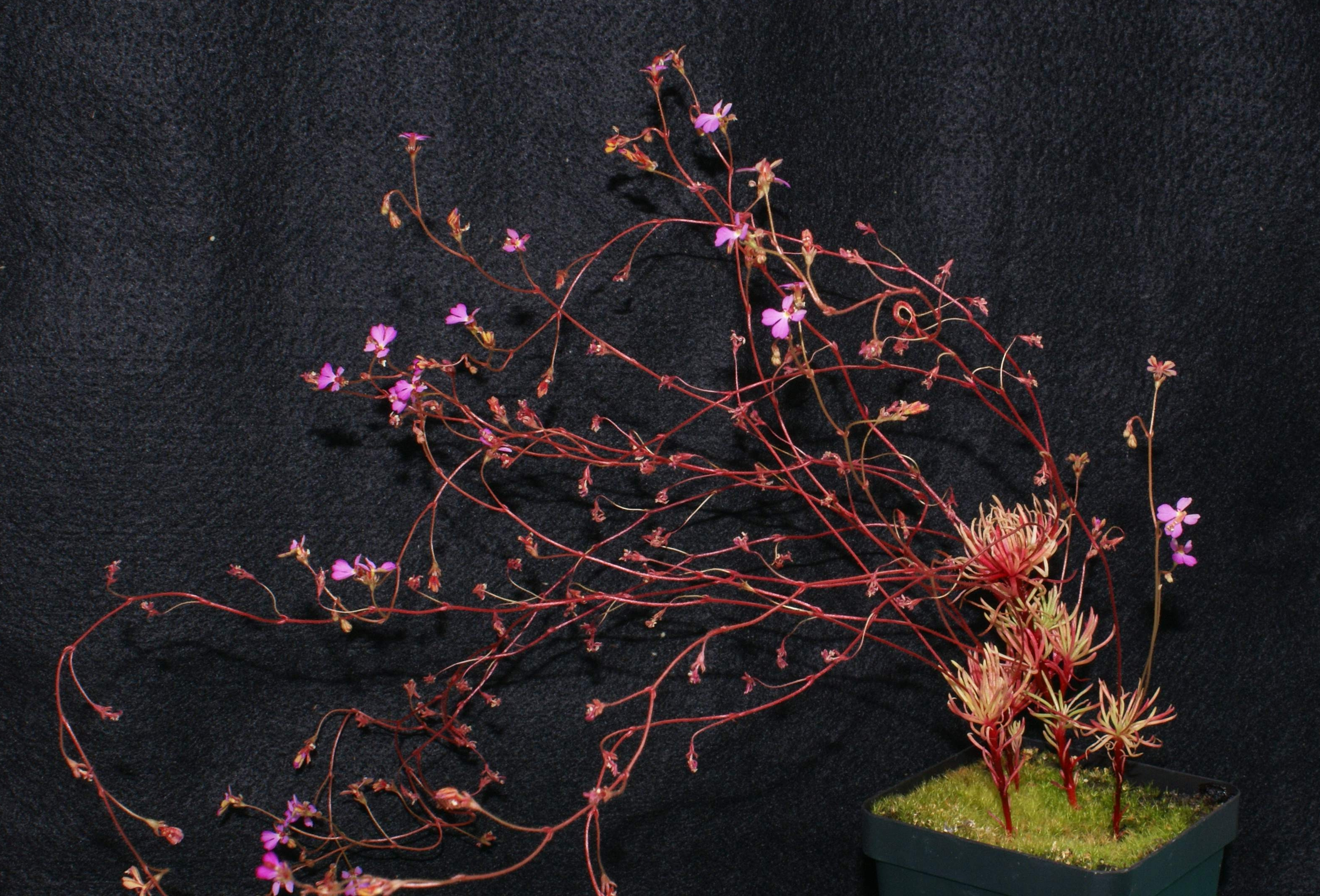
S. turbinatum in cultivation.

== See also ==
- List of Stylidium species
