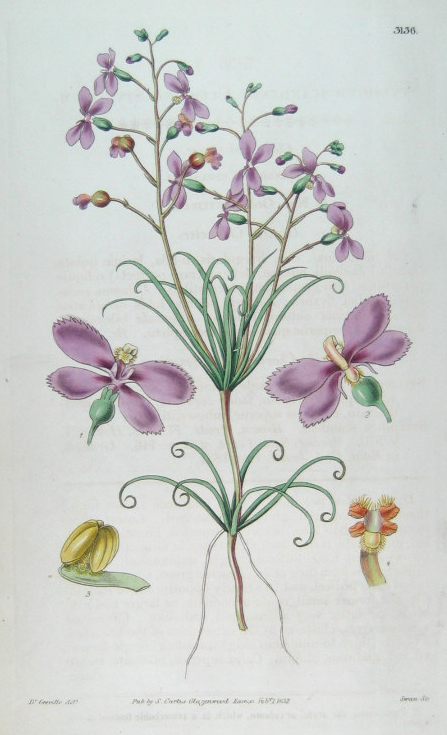
- Curtis's Botanical Magazine print of Stylidium scandens, a member of subgenus Tolypangium, section Verticillatae.

Scientific classification
- Kingdom: Plantae
- Clade: Tracheophytes
- Clade: Angiosperms
- Clade: Eudicots
- Clade: Asterids
- Order: Asterales
- Family: Stylidiaceae
- Genus: Stylidium
- Subgenus: Stylidium subg. Tolypangium
- Section: Stylidium sect. Verticillatae (Benth.) Mildbr.

Species
- Stylidium galioides Stylidium nonscandens Stylidium scandens Stylidium verticillatum

= Stylidium sect. Verticillatae =

Group of flowering plants

Verticillatae is a section in the subgenus Tolypangium (genus Stylidium) that is characterized by globose capsules. Recent genetic analysis, combined with an exhaustive morphological comparison, has revealed that the classification defined by Johannes Mildbraed in 1908 is not the most accurate description of how the members of different subgenera and sections are related. As part of the Flora of Australia series, Juliet Wege will be reviewing and updating the taxonomy of the Stylidiaceae.
