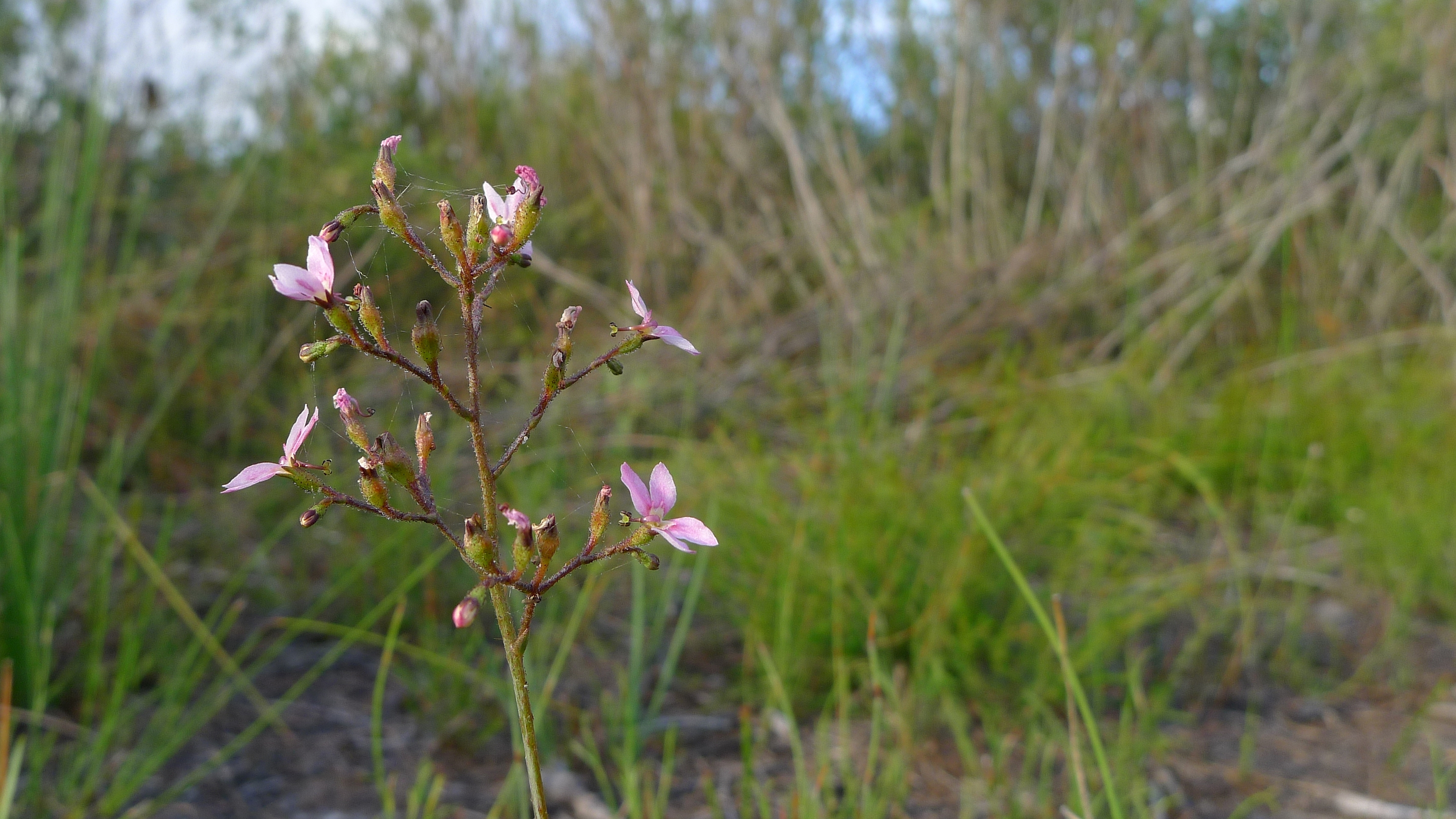

Scientific classification
- Kingdom: Plantae
- Clade: Tracheophytes
- Clade: Angiosperms
- Clade: Eudicots
- Clade: Asterids
- Order: Asterales
- Family: Stylidiaceae
- Genus: Stylidium
- Subgenus: Stylidium subg. Tolypangium
- Section: Stylidium sect. Debilia
- Species: S. paniculatum

Binomial name
- Stylidium paniculatum (Maiden & Betche) A.R.Bean

Synonyms
- S. debile var. paniculatum Maiden & Betche

= Stylidium paniculatum =

Species of carnivorous plant

Stylidium paniculatum is a dicotyledonous plant that belongs to the genus Stylidium (family Stylidiaceae). It is an herbaceous annual that grows from 10 to 35 cm tall. Oblanceolate or obovate leaves, about 6-30 per plant, form either a basal rosette with stems absent or in terminal rosettes when plant stems are present. The leaves are generally 10–31 mm long and 3–9 mm wide. This species produces one scape per plant. Inflorescences are 10–25 cm long and produce pink flowers that bloom from November to April in their native range. S. paniculatum is endemic to eastern Australia from Dalveen, Queensland to Tenterfield, New South Wales at elevations of 800 to 1000 metres. Its typical habitat has been reported as moist sandy soils on granite substrates along creeks, drains, or low-lying flats. S. paniculatum is closely related to S. debile and was originally described as a variety of S. debile, but raised to the species level by Anthony Bean in 1999. It differs from S. debile by the lack of bracteoles and its paniculate inflorescence. Its conservation status has been assessed as data deficient.

== See also ==
- List of Stylidium species
