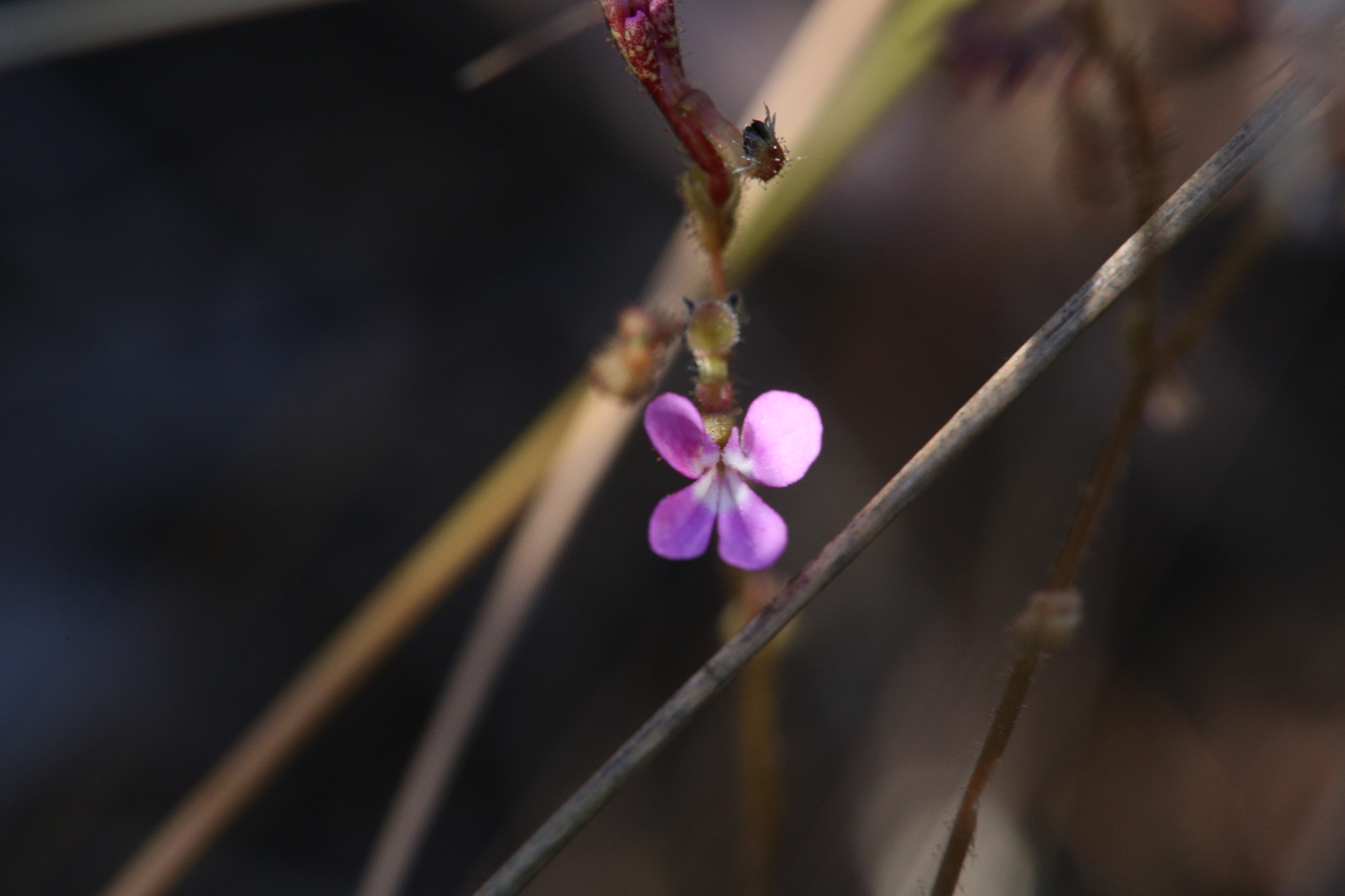

Scientific classification
- Kingdom: Plantae
- Clade: Tracheophytes
- Clade: Angiosperms
- Clade: Eudicots
- Clade: Asterids
- Order: Asterales
- Family: Stylidiaceae
- Genus: Stylidium
- Subgenus: Stylidium subg. Tolypangium
- Section: Stylidium sect. Debilia
- Species: S. leptorrhizum

Binomial name
- Stylidium leptorrhizum F.Muell. 1859

Synonyms
- Candollea leptorrhiza (F.Muell.) F.Muell. 1883; Stylidium barrettorum Lowrie & Kenneally 1997

= Stylidium leptorrhizum =

Species of carnivorous plant

Stylidium leptorrhizum is a species of dicotyledonous plant in the family Stylidiaceae.

== Description ==
It is an herbaceous annual plant that grows from 8 to 25 cm tall. Oblanceolate or elliptical leaves, about 10-20 per plant, form a basal rosette with stems absent. The leaves are generally 14–60 mm long and 3–9.5 mm wide. This species produces 1-3 scapes per plant. Inflorescences are 8–25 cm long and produce pink or mauve flowers that bloom from May to August in their native range.

== Distribution and habitat ==
S. leptorrhizum is endemic to the Kimberley region of Western Australia and the Victoria River district of the Northern Territory. Its typical habitat has been reported as sandy soils along creeks or billabongs.

== Taxonomy ==
S. leptorrhizum is most closely related to S. multiscapum. When reviewing section Debilia, Anthony Bean reduced the recently described S. barrettorum to synonymy with S. leptorrhizum after examining the type specimen.

== See also ==
- List of Stylidium species
