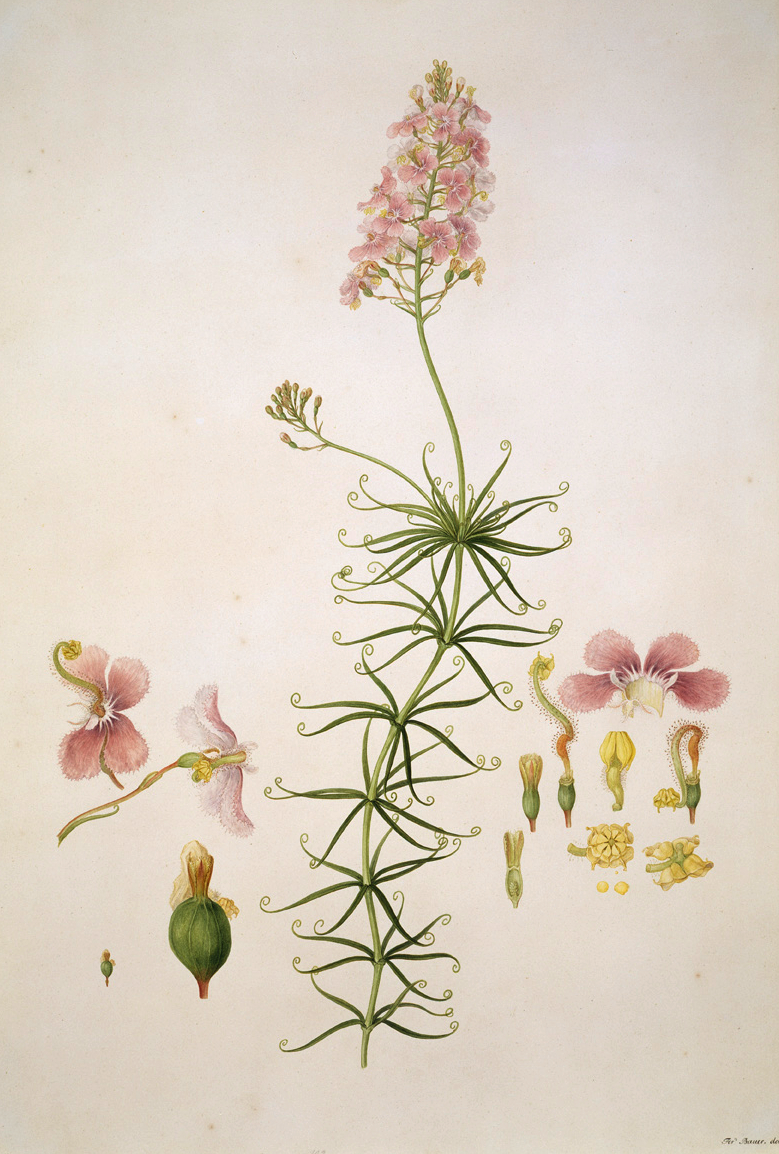

Scientific classification
- Kingdom: Plantae
- Clade: Tracheophytes
- Clade: Angiosperms
- Clade: Eudicots
- Clade: Asterids
- Order: Asterales
- Family: Stylidiaceae
- Genus: Stylidium
- Species: S. nymphaeum

Binomial name
- Stylidium nymphaeum Wege

= Stylidium nymphaeum =

Species of carnivorous plant

Stylidium nymphaeum is a climbing triggerplant found along the southern coast of Southwest Australia. The species uses the curved tips of its leaves to clamber over nearby plants, attaining a height between 1.4 and 2.5 metres. These leaves are long and slender, between 15 and 75 millimetres in length and 0.8 to 2 millimetres in width, are hairless, and have an entire margin. The scape is also hairless. The flowers are pink to purple, appearing from December or January to May.

The species is found on sandy clay or peaty sands in seasonally wet, low-lying areas, and alongside creeks, in dense scrub.

Stylidium nymphaeum was described in 2010 by Juliet Wege, based on material collected by Robert Brown and illustrated by Ferdinand Bauer. Brown obtained several specimens at King George Sound that he eventually used for the type collection conceived as Stylidium scandens, though his notes made prior to that species first description identify the larger specimens he obtained at Lake Powell.

== See also ==
- List of Stylidium species
