= Column (botany) =

Reproductive structure that can be found in several plant families

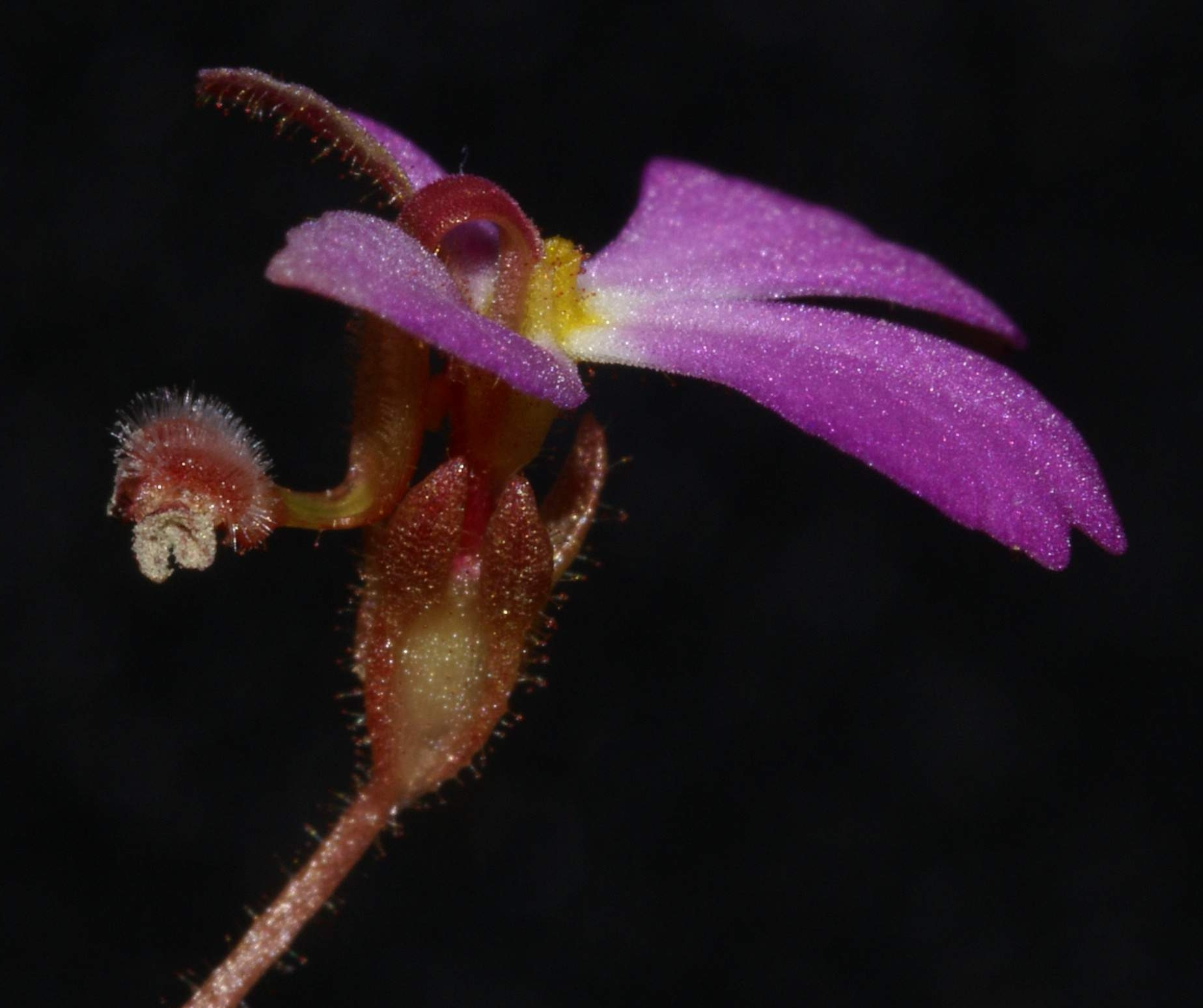
Flower of Stylidium turbinatum, showing the column.

The column, or technically the gynostemium, is a reproductive structure that can be found in several plant families: Aristolochiaceae, Orchidaceae, and Stylidiaceae.

It is derived from the fusion of both male and female parts (stamens and pistil) into a single organ. The top part of the column is formed by the anther, which is covered by an anther cap. This means that the style and stigma of the pistil, with the filaments and one or more anthers, are all united.

== Orchidaceae ==
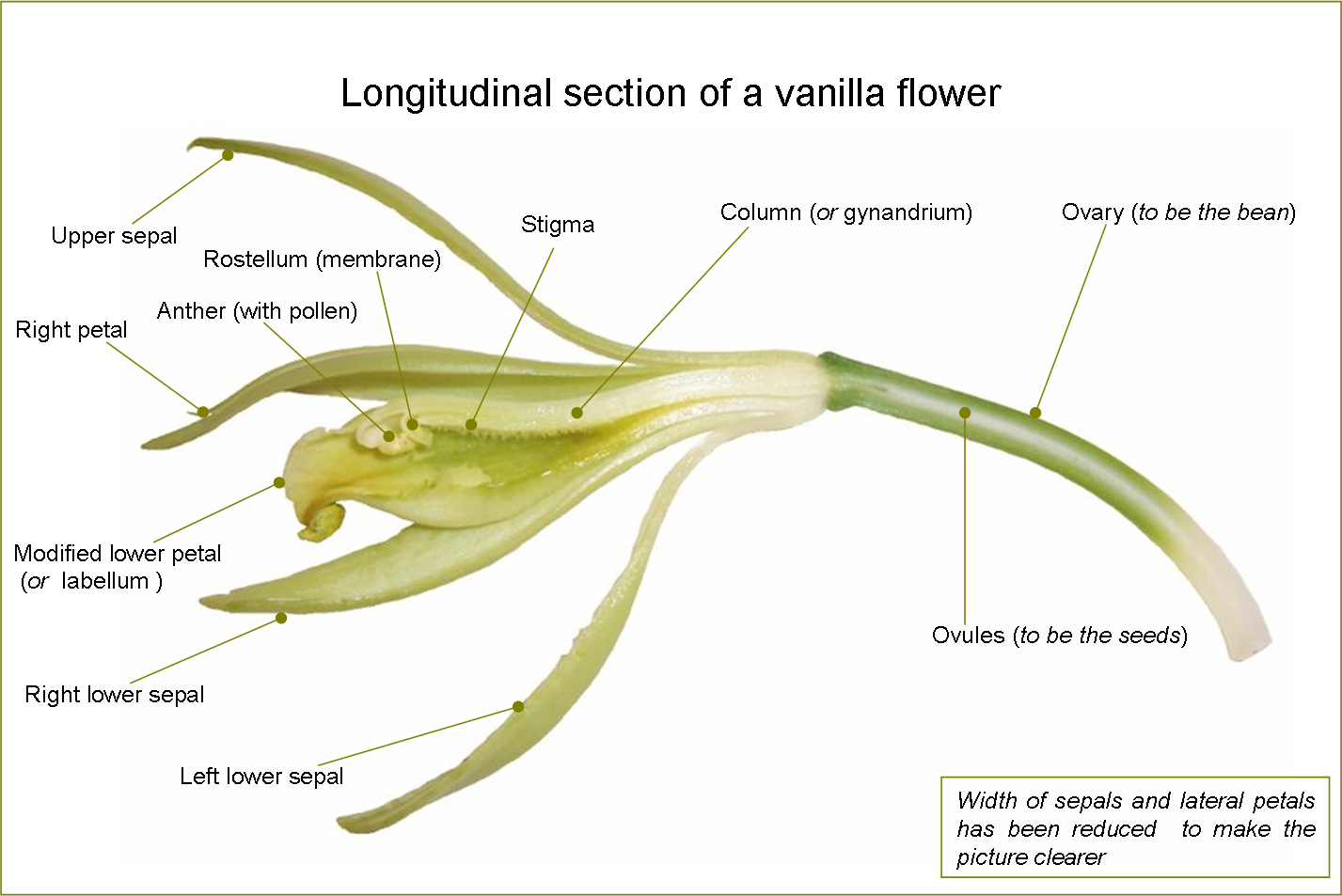
Longitudinal view of a vanilla flower, showing the column

The stigma sits at the apex of the column in the front but is pointing downwards after resupination (the rotation by 180 degrees before unfolding of the flower).

This stigma has the form of a small bowl, the clinandrium, a viscous surface embedding the (generally) single anther. On top of it all is the anther cap. Sometimes there is a small extension or little beak to the median stigma lobe, called rostellum.

Column wings may project laterally from the stigma. The column foot is formed by the attachment of the lip to the basal protruding part of the column. One speaks of a mentum (chin) if the lateral sepals are also basally adnate (which are attached to the foot of the column).

The column both releases pollen and also receives it (from another individual) for fertilization. In the family Orchidaceae, unlike almost all other flowering plants, the single male anther at the tip of the column produces pollen that is not free and powdery but held in waxy masses of two, four or six pellets called pollinia. The transfer of pollinia from one flower to another, though highly efficient, is often reliant upon one particular species of arthropods and it can be catastrophic for the population if its pollinator disappears from the community.
