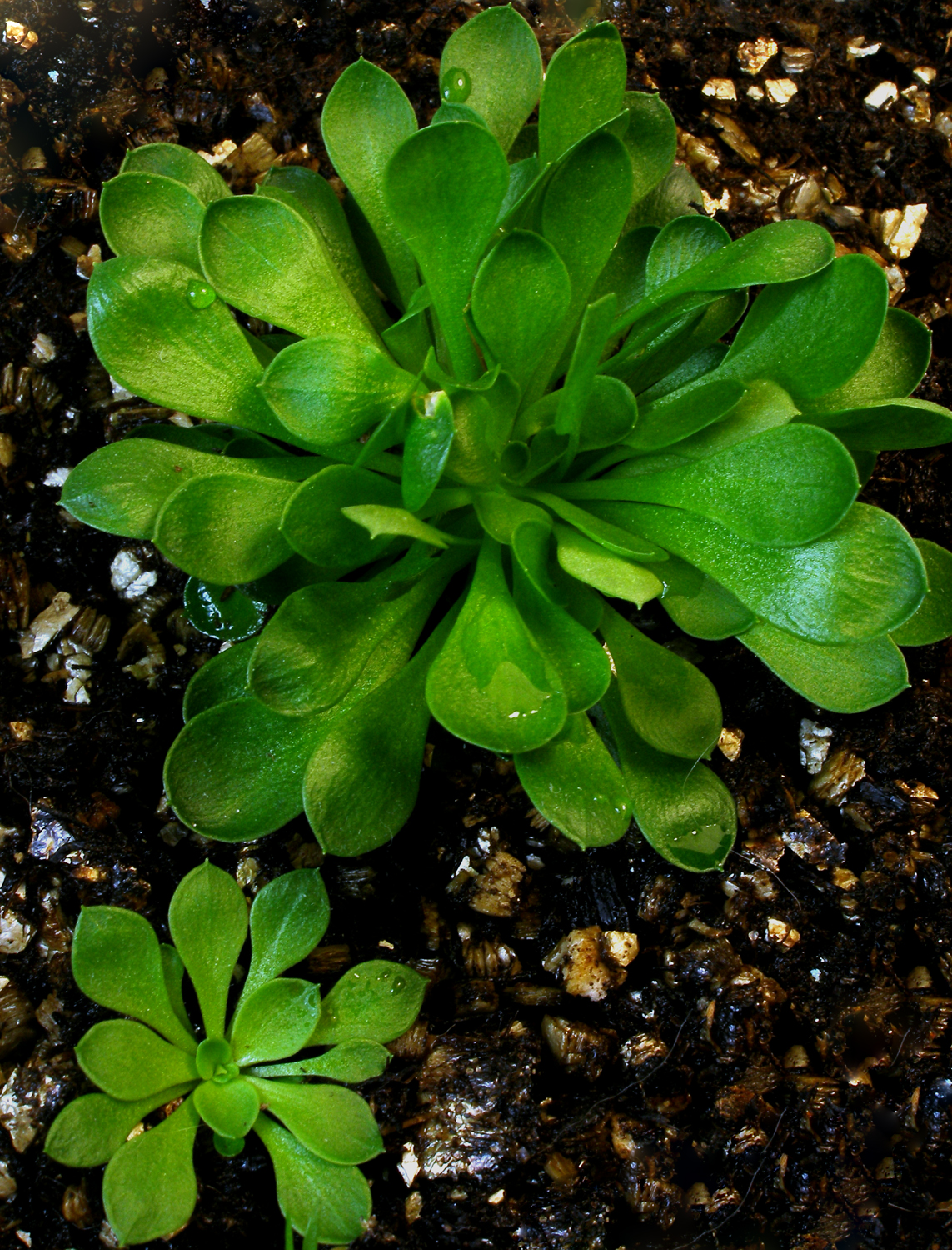
- Stylidium debile

Scientific classification
- Kingdom: Plantae
- Clade: Tracheophytes
- Clade: Angiosperms
- Clade: Eudicots
- Clade: Asterids
- Order: Asterales
- Family: Stylidiaceae
- Genus: Stylidium
- Subgenus: Stylidium subg. Tolypangium
- Section: Stylidium sect. Debilia; Mildbr.

Type species
- Stylidium debile F.Muell.

Species
- Stylidium austrocapense Stylidium debile Stylidium floribundum Stylidium inaequipetalum Stylidium leptorrhizum Stylidium multiscapum Stylidium ornatum Stylidium paniculatum Stylidium semipartitum Stylidium velleioides

= Stylidium sect. Debilia =

Group of flowering plants

Stylidium section Debilia is a taxonomic rank under Stylidium subgenus Tolypangium. In his 1908 monograph on the family Stylidiaceae, Johannes Mildbraed had established this section as Debiles. In 1999, A.R. Bean published a taxonomic revision of several sections in subgenus Tolypangium in which he renamed the section from Debiles to Debilia.

Species in this section are distinguished by their cylindrical, unthickened rootstocks. They generally have oblanceolate, elliptical, or obovate leaves that are in terminal rosettes or cauline in growth habit. Their flower petals are all free and entire. This section contains ten species in total that are all endemic to northern and eastern Australia.

== See also ==
- List of Stylidium species
