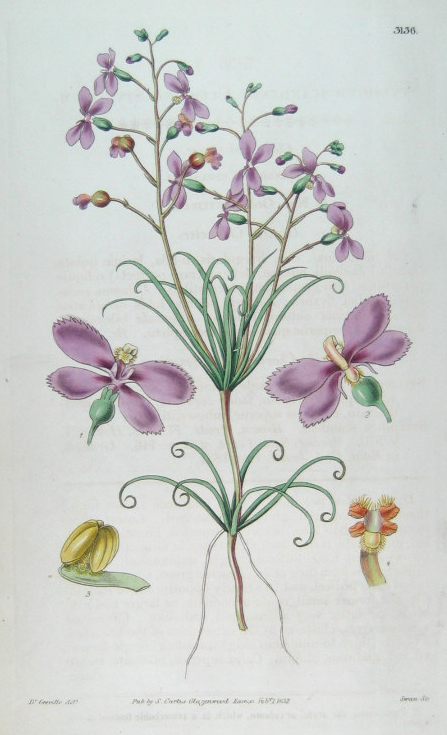
- Curtis's Botanical Magazine print of Stylidium scandens, a member of subgenus Tolypangium, section Verticillatae.

Scientific classification
- Kingdom: Plantae
- Clade: Tracheophytes
- Clade: Angiosperms
- Clade: Eudicots
- Clade: Asterids
- Order: Asterales
- Family: Stylidiaceae
- Genus: Stylidium
- Subgenus: Stylidium subg. Tolypangium (Endl.) Mildbr.

Sections
- Despectae; Debilia; Echinospermum; Floodia; Guttatae; Junceae; Lanata; Lineares; Repentes; Saxifragoidea; Sparsifoliae; Squamosae; Verticillatae

= Stylidium subg. Tolypangium =

Subgenus of flowering plants

Tolypangium is a subgenus of the genus Stylidium that is characterized by ovoid to longish capsules. This subgenus was part of the earliest taxonomic division among the triggerplants (genus Stylidium). Stephan Ladislaus Endlicher first split the genus into two subgenera in 1838: Tolypangium with its ovoid capsules and Nitrangium with its linear capsules. Subsequent authors generally followed this classification, which is based almost entirely on the features of the capsule. Recent genetic analysis, combined with an exhaustive morphological comparison, has revealed that the classification defined by Johannes Mildbraed in 1908 is not the most accurate description of how the members of different subgenera and sections are related. As part of the Flora of Australia series, Juliet Wege will be reviewing and updating the taxonomy of the Stylidiaceae.
