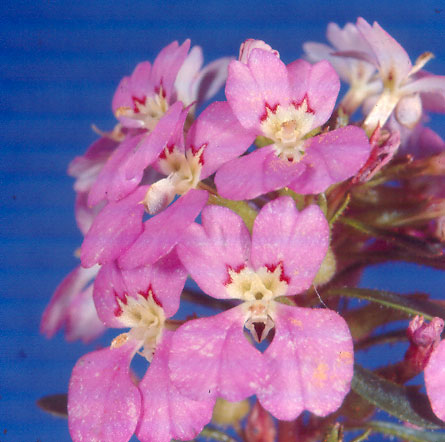
- The beautiful stylewort has the largest flowers of any in Levenhookia

Conservation status
- Priority Two — Poorly Known Taxa (DEC)

Scientific classification
- Kingdom: Plantae
- Clade: Tracheophytes
- Clade: Angiosperms
- Clade: Eudicots
- Clade: Asterids
- Order: Asterales
- Family: Stylidiaceae
- Genus: Levenhookia
- Section: L. sect. Coleostylis
- Species: L. pulcherrima

Binomial name
- Levenhookia pulcherrima Carlquist

= Levenhookia pulcherrima =

Species of flowering plant

Levenhookia pulcherrima, the beautiful stylewort, is a dicotyledonous plant that belongs to the genus Levenhookia (family Stylidiaceae). It is an ephemeral annual that grows on average from 7–8 centimetres (2.8–3.1 in) tall. Lower leaves are spathulate while upper leaves are oblanceolate and up to 1.8 centimetres (0.71 in) long. Stems and older leaves are red. Flowers are pink to rose-coloured with the shorter anterior petals about 3 millimetres (0.12 in) long. The sensitive labellum is obovate and white with a circular grey-purple mark on either side of the terminal portion. Both leaves and stems of L. pulcherrima possess more glandular trichomes than in other Levenhookia species. When describing this new species, Sherwin Carlquist noted that it is most closely related to L. preissii and L. pauciflora, which might place it with those species in section Levenhookia, but Carlquist neglected to specifically say so. He also noted that several features of this species, including its corolla lobe, labellum, throat appendage, and stigma morphology, are distinctly different from those species with which it appears to be associated. L. pulcherrima is endemic to southwestern Western Australia.
