= Levenhookia sect. Estipitatae =

Scientific classification
- Kingdom: Plantae
- Clade: Tracheophytes
- Clade: Angiosperms
- Clade: Eudicots
- Clade: Asterids
- Order: Asterales
- Family: Stylidiaceae
- Genus: Levenhookia
- Section: L. sect. Estipitatae; Mildbr.

Species
- Levenhookia dubia Levenhookia leptantha Levenhookia sonderi

Group of flowering plants

Levenhookia sect. Estipitatae (sometimes spelled as Exstipitatae) is a section of two to three recognized species in the family Stylidiaceae. It was established and described by Johannes Mildbraed in 1908 to separate the subgeneric taxonomy in the genus Levenhookia. Mildbraed originally placed L. dubia and L. leptantha in this section. L. sonderi was described by Mildbraed as a variety of L. dubia, though other resources treat it as a distinct species.
