= Stylidium edentatum =

Scientific classification
- Kingdom: Plantae
- Clade: Tracheophytes
- Clade: Angiosperms
- Clade: Eudicots
- Clade: Asterids
- Order: Asterales
- Family: Stylidiaceae
- Genus: Stylidium
- Subgenus: Stylidium subg. Centridium
- Species: S. edentatum

Binomial name
- Stylidium edentatum Lowrie & Carlquist 1989

Species of carnivorous plant

Stylidium edentatum is a dicotyledonous plant that belongs to the genus Stylidium (family Stylidiaceae). It is an annual plant that grows around 6 cm tall. The elliptical leaves form a basal rosettes around the stem. The leaves are around 0.3-0.8 mm long with recurved margins. Inflorescences are produced on solitary scapes and bear flowers that are white with rose-coloured markings at the base of the corolla lobes and two tooth-shaped throat appendages present. S. edentatum was a previously overlooked species that is related to and appears similar to S. calcaratum and S. ecorne. Allen Lowrie and Sherwin Carlquist described this species in 1989 and argued that if S. ecorne is considered distinct from S. calcaratum, then certainly S. edentatum warrants placement at the species level. It differs from S. calcaratum and S. ecorne by the long petioles on its recurved leaves, and the cuneate, obtuse, and unlobed posterior corolla lobes. They also have a distinctive lateral toothlike appendage at the base of each posterior corolla lobe. S. edentatum is endemic to southwestern Western Australia.

== See also ==
- List of Stylidium species
