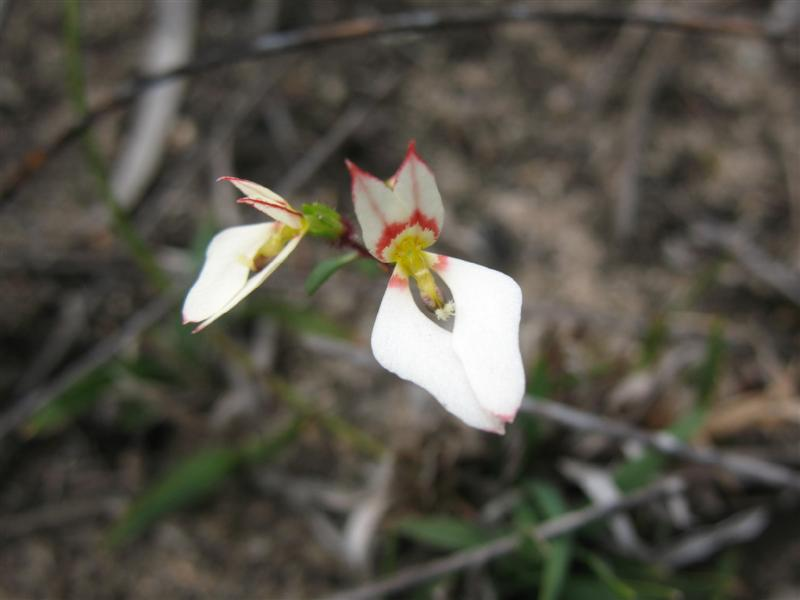
- Levenhookia pauciflora

Scientific classification
- Kingdom: Plantae
- Clade: Tracheophytes
- Clade: Angiosperms
- Clade: Eudicots
- Clade: Asterids
- Order: Asterales
- Family: Stylidiaceae
- Subfamily: Stylidioideae
- Genus: Levenhookia; R.Br.

Sections and species
- Coleostylis Levenhookia chippendalei Levenhookia octomaculata Levenhookia preissii Levenhookia stipitata Estipitatae Levenhookia dubia Levenhookia leptantha Levenhookia sonderi Levenhookia Levenhookia pauciflora Levenhookia pulcherrima Levenhookia pusilla

Synonyms
- Coleostylis Sond.; Leeuwenhoekia Spreng.

= Levenhookia =

Genus of flowering plants

Levenhookia, also known as the styleworts, is a genus of ten recognized species in the family Stylidiaceae and is endemic to Australia. The genus is restricted to Western Australia almost exclusively with a few exceptions: L. pusilla's range extends into South Australia, L. dubia's range extends through South Australia into Victoria and New South Wales, L. sonderi is native only to Victoria, and L. chippendalei is also found in the Northern Territory.

All species of Levenhookia possess a sensitive labellum that performs a similar function to the column of Stylidium species. The labellum responds to touch and enables the plants to promote cross-pollination and avoid self-pollination. Most species of Levenhookia are ephemeral plants that prefer sand heath habitat. Levenhookia species also possess glandular trichomes similar to those of its sister genus, Stylidium. While no studies have been done to test Levenhookia for carnivory, it is plausible that they are carnivorous plants like the related Stylidium species.

== Evolution and taxonomy ==
Levenhookia preissii illustration from Johannes Mildbraed's 1908 monograph on the Stylidiaceae.

The genus is known to be closely related to the genus Stylidium. Specifically, the subgenus Centridium is the subgeneric taxonomy in the genus Stylidium that appears to be most closely related to Levenhookia and most suggests an ancestral relationship. Sherwin Carlquist notes that Levenhookia is most likely a derivative of Stylidium and has relied on outcropping as its mode of evolution. The species in this genus represent a series from L. preissii, which requires cross pollination for reproduction, to L. dubia, which relies on facultative self-pollination. In an earlier publication, Rica Erickson described this series in reverse, suggesting that path as the evolutionary sequence. Several species of Stylidium have also been noted to mimic flower morphology of certain Levenhookia species to utilize similar available pollinators. Specifically, S. xanthopis mimics L. leptantha and S. ecorne mimics L. pauciflora.

Three sections have been established and described by Johannes Mildbraed in 1908 to separate the subgeneric taxonomy in this genus. Section Coleostylis consists of L. chippendalei, L. preissii, L. stipitata, and possibly L. octomaculata, which Erickson described in 1956, noting its affinities with L. stipitata but without placing it in a section. Section Estipitatae consists of L. dubia, L. leptantha, and L. sonderi, which was considered by Mildbraed to be a variety of L. dubia. Section Levenhookia consists of L. pusilla and L. pauciflora, though it could also contain L. pulcherrima, which Carlquist described in 1969 and noted its close association to the other two species in section Levenhookia but neglected to place it within a section. Section Levenhookia was originally described by Mildbraed as section Eulevenhookia, which was later changed to the current section title Levenhookia as an autonym since it is the type section.
