= Levenhookia chippendalei =

Scientific classification
- Kingdom: Plantae
- Clade: Tracheophytes
- Clade: Angiosperms
- Clade: Eudicots
- Clade: Asterids
- Order: Asterales
- Family: Stylidiaceae
- Genus: Levenhookia
- Section: L. sect. Coleostylis
- Species: L. chippendalei

Binomial name
- Levenhookia chippendalei F.L.Erickson & J.H.Willis

Species of flowering plant

Levenhookia chippendalei is a dicotyledonous plant that belongs to the genus Levenhookia (family Stylidiaceae). It is named after its discoverer, George Chippendale, founder of the Northern Territory Herbarium. It grows from 8–18 centimetres (3.1–7.1 in) tall with oblanceolate leaves near the base of the plant. The few leaves this species produces are generally 2 millimetres (0.079 in) long. The inflorescences are racemose. Flowers are pink with 4–5 millimetres (0.16–0.20 in) long petals. The sensitive labellum is hood-like and dark red with yellow appendages. L. chippendalei is most closely related to L. preissii but differs in flower morphology. It shares a similar floral arrangement with Levenhookia stipitata.

L. chippendalei is the only species in the genus to be recorded from the Northern Territory. It has also been recorded from many locations in Western Australia and given a status of "not threatened" by FloraBase because of that wide abundance.
