= Stylidium weeliwolli =

Conservation status
- Priority Two — Poorly Known Taxa (DEC)

Scientific classification
- Kingdom: Plantae
- Clade: Tracheophytes
- Clade: Angiosperms
- Clade: Eudicots
- Clade: Asterids
- Order: Asterales
- Family: Stylidiaceae
- Genus: Stylidium
- Subgenus: Stylidium subg. Centridium
- Species: S. weeliwolli

Binomial name
- Stylidium weeliwolli Lowrie & Kenneally 1998

Species of carnivorous plant

Stylidium weeliwolli is a dicotyledonous plant that belongs to the genus Stylidium (family Stylidiaceae). It occurs in the North West of Western Australia

The specific epithet weeliwolli is Aboriginal Australian for "we are water running" or "running water", referring to the location where it was first discovered, Weeli Wolli Creek northwest of Newman. It is most likely an annual plant, though it has been reported to be a perennial. It grows from 10 to 25 cm tall. The spathulate or lanceolate leaves form a basal rosettes around the white stems. The leaves are around 6.5–27 mm long (mostly 11–13 cm) and 3–4.5 mm wide. Inflorescences are branched, around 10–25 cm long and produce flowers that are dark pink with red markings at the base of the corolla lobes and bloom from August to September in their native range. The anterior corolla lobes of this species cross over one another forming an x-shape.

Stylidium weeliwolli is only known from a few locations in northwestern Western Australia, but it is locally abundant at these locations. Its habitat is recorded as being sandy soils on watercourse edges, in wet areas, and a variety of other conditions in the presence of many companion plants. S. aceratum is most closely related to S. calcaratum.

== See also ==
- List of Stylidium species
