= Stylidium aceratum =

Conservation status
- Priority Two — Poorly Known Taxa (DEC)

Scientific classification
- Kingdom: Plantae
- Clade: Tracheophytes
- Clade: Angiosperms
- Clade: Eudicots
- Clade: Asterids
- Order: Asterales
- Family: Stylidiaceae
- Genus: Stylidium
- Subgenus: Stylidium subg. Centridium
- Species: S. aceratum

Binomial name
- Stylidium aceratum Lowrie & Kenneally 1998

Species of carnivorous plant

Stylidium aceratum is a dicotyledonous plant that belongs to the genus Stylidium (family Stylidiaceae). It occurs within the south west region of Western Australia

The specific epithet aceratum is Greek for "lacking horn", referring to absence of an appendage that is present in other species on the bend of the gynostemium. It is an annual plant that grows from 5 to 9 cm tall. The spathulate leaves form a basal rosettes around the translucent white stem. The leaves are around 3–6 mm long and 0.3-0.6 mm wide. Inflorescences are around 5–9 cm long and produce flowers that are dark pink and bloom from October to November in their native range. S. aceratum is only known from the type location, which is north of Bullsbrook, Western Australia. Its habitat is recorded as being sandy soils in swampy heathland. It grows in the presence of S. calcaratum and S. utricularioides. S. aceratum is most closely related to S. calcaratum, both of which have a chromosome number of n=11.

== See also ==
- List of Stylidium species
