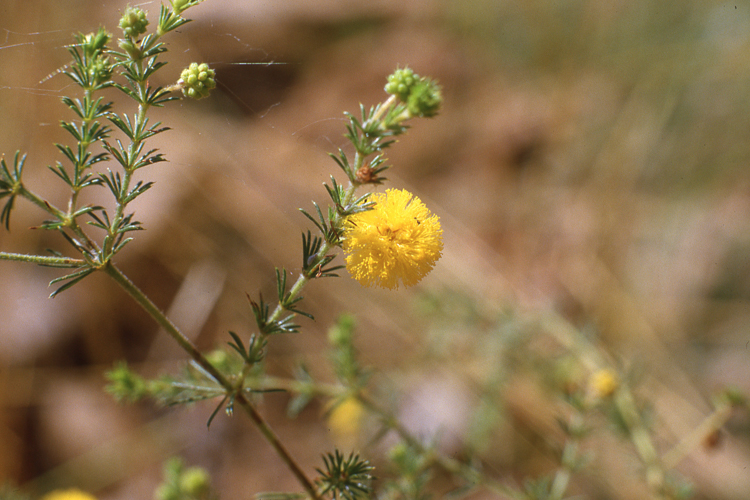
- In Nitmiluk National Park

Scientific classification
- Kingdom: Plantae
- Clade: Tracheophytes
- Clade: Angiosperms
- Clade: Eudicots
- Clade: Rosids
- Order: Fabales
- Family: Fabaceae
- Subfamily: Caesalpinioideae
- Clade: Mimosoid clade
- Genus: Acacia
- Species: A. chippendalei

Binomial name
- Acacia chippendalei Pedley
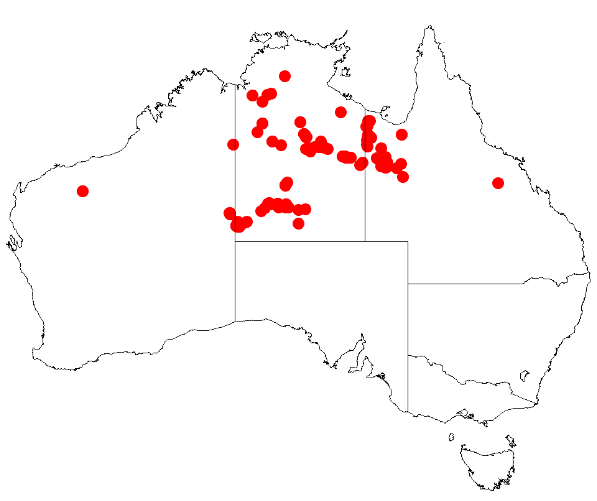
- Occurrence data from AVH

Synonyms
- Racosperma chippendalei Pedley Pedley

= Acacia chippendalei =

Chippendale's wattle

Species of legume

Acacia chippendalei, commonly known as Chippendale's wattle, is a species of flowering plant in the family Fabaceae and is endemic to northern Australia. It is a spreading shrub with phyllodes in whorls of 8 to 11, heads of yellow flowers and linear, sticky pods.

== Description ==
Acacia chippendalei is a spreading, sprawling shrub that typically grows to a height of 20–50 cm (7.9–19.7 in) and has stems are covered in fine velvety, more or less erect, spreading white hairs. Its phyllodes are arranged in whorls of 8 to 11 and are slightly flattened, more or less straight 2.5–8 mm (0.098–0.315 in) long with a short point on the tip and hairy. There are stipules 0.4–1 mm (0.016–0.039 in) long at the base of the phyllodes. The flowers are yellow and borne in heads of 20 to 25 on a hairy peduncle 4–20 mm (0.16–0.79 in) long. Flowering occurs in most months with a peak in September and October. The pods are sessile linear, glabrous and sticky, 15–70 mm (0.59–2.76 in) long and 5–7 mm (0.20–0.28 in) wide.

== Taxonomy ==
Acacia chippendalei was first formally described by the botanist Leslie Pedley in 1972 Contributions from the Queensland Herbarium from specimens collected in the Northern Territory by George Chippendale. The etymology of the specific epithet was not specified, but was probably named for the collector of the type specimen.

== Distribution ==
Chippendale's wattle is found from the Sir Frederick Range in the east of Western Australia, through central parts of the Northern Territory to around Cloncurry and Mount Isa in north-western Queensland, where it grows in skeletal rocky lateritic and deep sandy soils.

== See also ==
- List of Acacia species
