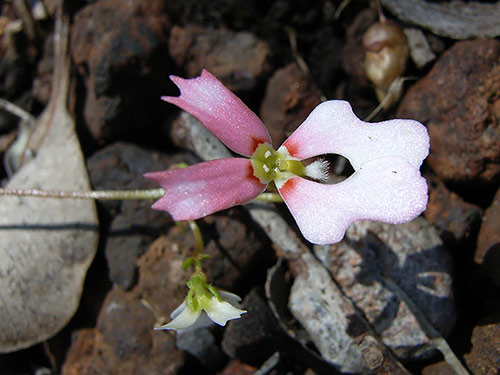
- Stylidium calcaratum

Scientific classification
- Kingdom: Plantae
- Clade: Tracheophytes
- Clade: Angiosperms
- Clade: Eudicots
- Clade: Asterids
- Order: Asterales
- Family: Stylidiaceae
- Genus: Stylidium
- Subgenus: Stylidium subg. Centridium; Lindl.

Species
- Stylidium aceratum Stylidium calcaratum Stylidium ceratophorum Stylidium diceratum Stylidium ecorne Stylidium edentatum Stylidium longicornu Stylidium perpusillum Stylidium weeliwolli

= Stylidium subg. Centridium =

Subgenus of flowering plants

Stylidium subg. Centridium is a subgenus of Stylidium that is characterized by a globose hypanthium, a stipitate brush-like stigma, and gynostemium mobility not produced by a sensitive hinged torosus but by the movement of a cunabulum. All species with the possible and doubtful exception of S. weeliwolli are annuals. This subgenus appears to be most closely related to the genus Levenhookia, which suggests an ancestral relationship. Centridium was first published by John Lindley in the 1839 publication, A Sketch of the Vegetation of the Swan River Colony. Lindley created this subgenus to distinguish species which did not fit into either of the two other subgenera that had existed at the time. He initially placed Stylidium calcaratum, the newly described Stylidium androsaceum, and Stylidium stipitatum into subgenus Centridium. His description of S. androsaceum turned out to be synonymous with S. calcaratum and S. stipitatum is a synonym of Levenhookia stipitata.

== See also ==
- List of Stylidium species
