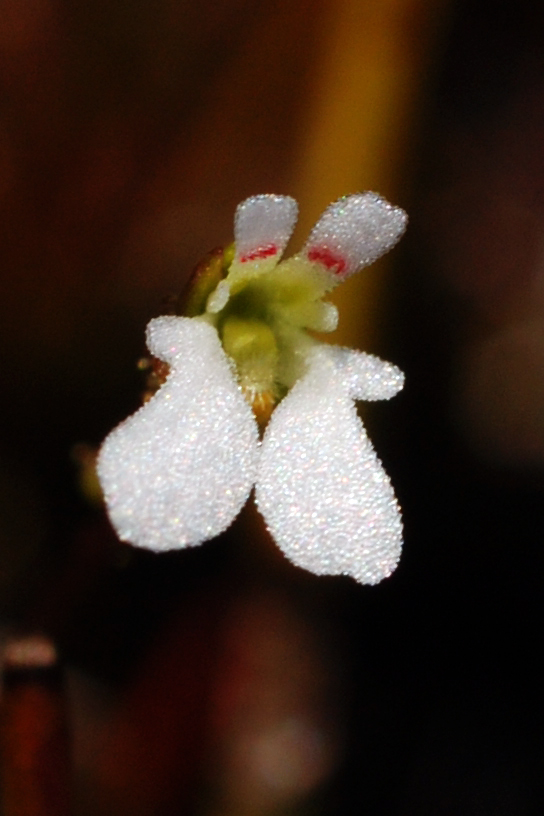

Scientific classification
- Kingdom: Plantae
- Clade: Tracheophytes
- Clade: Angiosperms
- Clade: Eudicots
- Clade: Asterids
- Order: Asterales
- Family: Stylidiaceae
- Genus: Stylidium
- Subgenus: Stylidium subg. Centridium
- Species: S. perpusillum

Binomial name
- Stylidium perpusillum Hook.f.

Synonyms
- S. perminutum F.Muell.

= Stylidium perpusillum =

Species of carnivorous plant

Stylidium perpusillum, the tiny triggerplant, is a dicotyledonous plant that belongs to the genus Stylidium (family Stylidiaceae), that occurs in south west Western Australia.

It is an ephemeral annual that grows from 1.5 to 4 cm tall. It bears white flowers with undivided posterior corolla petals that bloom from September to November in its native range. Its habitat has been reported as being sand to clay soils in winter-wet depressions near granitic rocks. S. perpusillum is a tropical species endemic to southwestern, Western Australia and is considered to be the smallest species in the genus Stylidium. Johannes Mildbraed, in his 1908 monograph on the family, described S. perpusillum as also being present in Victoria and Tasmania, but all other collections since have only been in Western Australia.

== See also ==
- List of Stylidium species
