= Levenhookia sonderi =

Scientific classification
- Kingdom: Plantae
- Clade: Tracheophytes
- Clade: Angiosperms
- Clade: Eudicots
- Clade: Asterids
- Order: Asterales
- Family: Stylidiaceae
- Genus: Levenhookia
- Section: L. sect. Coleostylis
- Species: L. sonderi

Binomial name
- Levenhookia sonderi (F.Muell.) F.Muell.

Synonyms
- Coleostylis sonderi F.Muell.; L. dubia var. sonderi (F.Muell.) Mildbr.

Species of flowering plant

Levenhookia sonderi, the slender stylewort, is a dicotyledonous plant that belongs to the genus Levenhookia (family Stylidiaceae). It is an ephemeral annual that grows only in Victoria, Australia. L. sonderi is most closely related to L. dubia and it has even been described as a variety of L. dubia in the past. Johannes Mildbraed was the first person to reduce L. sonderi to a variety of L. dubia in his 1908 taxonomic monograph on the Stylidiaceae in which he noted he could not find any significant difference between L. sonderi and L. dubia to maintain the separate taxonomic treatment of the two species. Later studies have considered the species to be distinct.
