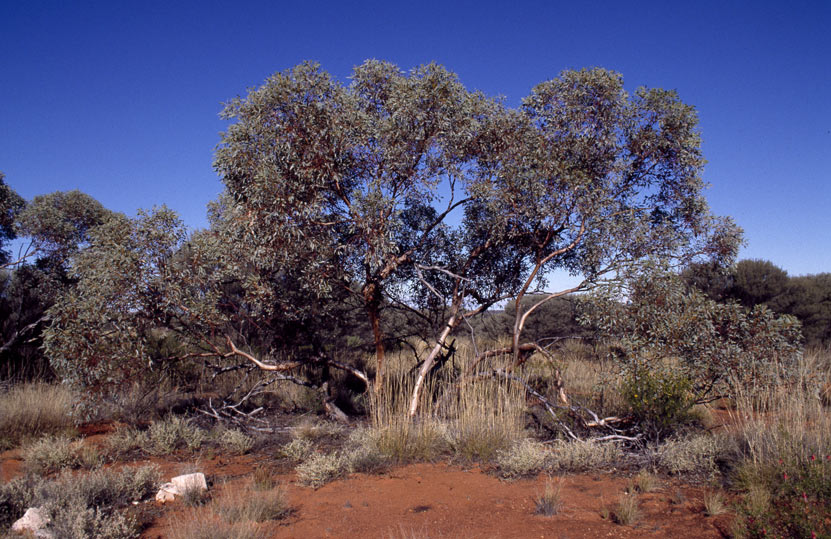
- Eucalyptus trivalva in the Great Victoria Desert in Western Australia

Scientific classification
- Kingdom: Plantae
- Clade: Embryophytes
- Clade: Tracheophytes
- Clade: Spermatophytes
- Clade: Angiosperms
- Clade: Eudicots
- Clade: Rosids
- Order: Myrtales
- Family: Myrtaceae
- Genus: Eucalyptus
- Species: E. trivalva

Binomial name
- Eucalyptus trivalva Blakely

Synonyms
- Eucalyptus trivalvis J.W.Green orth. var.

= Eucalyptus trivalva =

Victoria Spring mallee

Species of eucalyptus

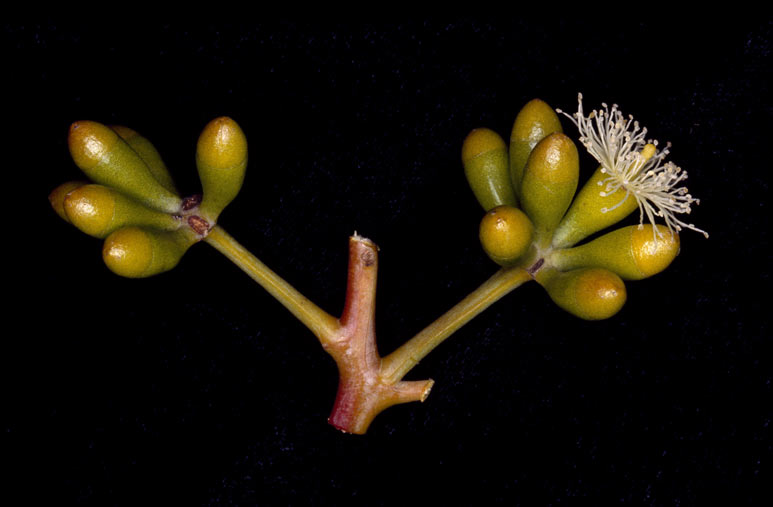
Flower buds

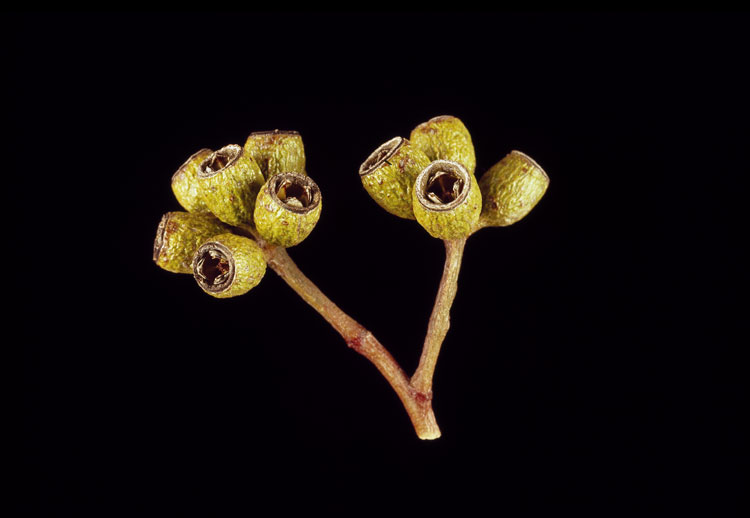
Fruit

Eucalyptus trivalva, commonly known as Victoria Spring mallee or desert mallee, is a species of mallee or small tree that is endemic to arid areas of central Australia. It has rough, partly shed bark on some or all of the trunk, smooth bark above, lance-shaped to elliptical adult leaves, flower buds in groups of nine or eleven, white flowers and cup-shaped, cylindrical or conical fruit.

== Description ==
Eucalyptus trivalva is a mallee or a tree that typically grows to a height of 2 to 8 metres (7 to 26 ft) and forms a lignotuber. It has loose, rough, fibrous, grey to dark grey-brown bark on some or all of the lower stems, smooth coppery to grey or cream-coloured bark above and yellowish branchlets. Young plants and coppice regrowth have leaves that are dull bluish grey to glaucous, egg-shaped, 50–80 mm (2.0–3.1 in) long and 30–55 mm (1.2–2.2 in) wide. Adult leaves are the same shade of dull greyish to bluish green on both sides, lance-shaped to elliptical, 50–140 mm (2.0–5.5 in) long and 8–28 mm (0.31–1.10 in) wide, tapering to a petiole 8–23 mm (0.31–0.91 in) long. The flower buds are arranged in leaf axils on an unbranched peduncle 5–20 mm (0.20–0.79 in) long, the individual buds on pedicels 1–4 mm (0.039–0.157 in) long. Mature buds are oval, to spindle-shaped, 7–10 mm (0.28–0.39 in) long and 4–6 mm (0.16–0.24 in) wide and yellowish green with a conical to rounded operculum. Flowering occurs between January and August and the flowers are white. The fruit is a woody cup-shaped, cylindrical or conical capsule 5–10 mm (0.20–0.39 in) long and 5–8 mm (0.20–0.31 in) wide with the valves at or below rim level.

== Taxonomy and naming ==
Eucalyptus trivalva was first formally described by the botanist William Blakely in 1936 in an article published in Transactions and Proceedings of the Royal Society of South Australia. The specific epithet (trivalva) is taken from Latin words meaning "three" and meaning "valve", referring to the three-valved fruits produced by this species.

In 1988, George Chippendale changed the name to Eucalyptus trivalvis, (meaning "three-valved", as distinct from "three valve") in Flora of Australia but the change is not accepted by the Australian Plant Census.

== Distribution ==
Victoria Spring mallee is found in arid and semi-arid areas on sand plains, dunes and ridges in central Australia. In Western Australia it is found in central parts of the Goldfields-Esperance, Pilbara, and Mid West regions from around Newman in the north to Kalgoorlie in the south. In the Northern Territory it is found south from near Alice Springs and in South Australia in western parts in open mallee vegetation on gravelly sands and on rocky rises.

== See also ==
- List of Eucalyptus species
