= Ptilotus chippendalei =

Scientific classification
- Kingdom: Plantae
- Clade: Tracheophytes
- Clade: Angiosperms
- Clade: Eudicots
- Order: Caryophyllales
- Family: Amaranthaceae
- Genus: Ptilotus
- Species: P. chippendalei

Binomial name
- Ptilotus chippendalei Benl

Species of grass-like plant

Ptilotus chippendalei is a species of flowering plant in the family Amaranthaceae and is endemic to inland areas of Australia. It is a prostrate annual herb, with leaves that are hairy at first, later glabrous, and oval or cylindrical spikes of pinkish-mauve flowers.

== Description ==
Ptilotus chippendalei is a prostrate annual herb that has several stems that are hairy at first, later glabrous. Its leaves are 5–75 mm (0.20–2.95 in) long and 1–30 mm (0.039–1.181 in) wide. The flowers are densely arranged in oval or cylindrical, pinkish-mauve spikes. The bracts are hairy, 5.9–7.3 mm (0.23–0.29 in) long and the bracteoles 6–7 mm (0.24–0.28 in) long and sometimes awned. The outer tepals are 12.5–14.5 mm (0.49–0.57 in) long, the inner tepals 11–13 mm (0.43–0.51 in) long. The style is 3.8–4.7 mm (0.15–0.19 in) long, curved and obliquely fixed to the ovary. Flowering occurs from June to August.

== Taxonomy ==
Ptilotus chippendalei was first formally described in 1964 by Gerhard Benl in Mitteilungen der Botanischen Staatssammlung Munchen from specimens collected on Mount Cooper, 30 mi (48 km) south-west of the Blackstone Mining Camp in 1958. The specific epithet (chippendalei) honours the botanist George Chippendale.

== Distribution and habitat ==
Ptilotus chippendalei grows in open mulga woodland in the Central Ranges, Great Victoria Desert and Murchison bioregions of Western Australia, and near the borders with the Northern Territory and South Australia.

== Conservation status ==
This species of Ptilotus is listed as "not threatened" by the Government of Western Australia Department of Biodiversity, Conservation and Attractions.

== See also ==
- List of Ptilotus species
