= Goodenia centralis =

Scientific classification
- Kingdom: Plantae
- Clade: Tracheophytes
- Clade: Angiosperms
- Clade: Eudicots
- Clade: Asterids
- Order: Asterales
- Family: Goodeniaceae
- Genus: Goodenia
- Species: G. centralis

Binomial name
- Goodenia centralis Carolin

Species of plant

Goodenia centralis is a species of flowering plant in the family Goodeniaceae and is endemic to central Australia. It is a prostrate, annual herb with coarsely toothed, spatula-shaped to egg-shaped leaves with the narrower end towards the base, and racemes of yellow flowers with purple veins.

== Description ==
Goodenia centralis is a prostrate annual herb with more or less glabrous stems up to 0.5 m (1 ft 8 in) long. The leaves are spatula-shaped to egg-shaped with the narrower end towards the base, 30–100 mm (1.2–3.9 in) long and 15–30 mm (0.59–1.18 in) wide and coarsely-toothed. The flowers are arranged in racemes up to 600 mm (24 in) long on a peduncle 10–40 mm (0.39–1.57 in) long, each flower on a pedicel 1–2 mm (0.039–0.079 in) long with leaf-like bracteoles 1–2 mm (0.039–0.079 in) long at the base. The sepals are about 2 mm (0.079 in) long, the petals yellow with purple veins, 12–15 mm (0.47–0.59 in) long. The lower lobes of the corolla are about 5 mm (0.20 in) long with wings about 1.5 mm (0.059 in) wide. Flowering mainly occurs from June to September and the fruit is an elliptic capsule about 8 mm (0.31 in) long.

== Taxonomy and naming ==
Goodenia centralis was first formally described in 1980 by Roger Charles Carolin in the journal Telopea from material collected by George Chippendale near Irving Creek in the Petermann Ranges in the Northern Territory in 1958. The specific epithet (centralis) refers to the central Australian habitat.

== Distribution and habitat ==
This goodenia grows in woodland and tussock grassland on sand in the deserts of central-eastern Western Australia, south-western Northern Territory and northern South Australia.

== Conservation status ==
Goodenia centralis is classified as "not threatened" by the Government of Western Australia Department of Parks and Wildlife, and as "least concern" under the Northern Territory Government Territory Parks and Wildlife Conservation Act 1976.
