= Levenhookia pusilla =

Scientific classification
- Kingdom: Plantae
- Clade: Tracheophytes
- Clade: Angiosperms
- Clade: Eudicots
- Clade: Asterids
- Order: Asterales
- Family: Stylidiaceae
- Genus: Levenhookia
- Section: L. sect. Levenhookia
- Species: L. pusilla

Binomial name
- Levenhookia pusilla R.Br.

Species of plant

Levenhookia pusilla, the midget stylewort or tiny stylewort, is a dicotyledonous plant that belongs to the genus Levenhookia (family Stylidiaceae). It is an ephemeral annual that grows about 5 to 6 cm tall with suborbicular to ovate-spathulate leaves. Flowers are pink to white and bloom from September to December in its native range. L. pusilla is endemic to southwestern Western Australia and South Australia where it grows in granitic or lateritic soils.
