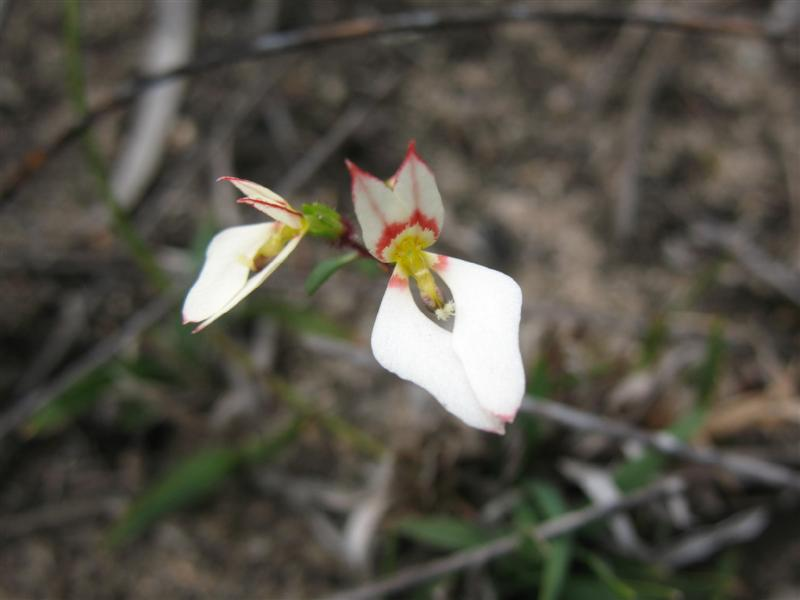

Scientific classification
- Kingdom: Plantae
- Clade: Tracheophytes
- Clade: Angiosperms
- Clade: Eudicots
- Clade: Asterids
- Order: Asterales
- Family: Stylidiaceae
- Genus: Levenhookia
- Section: L. sect. Levenhookia
- Species: L. pauciflora

Binomial name
- Levenhookia pauciflora Benth.

Synonyms
- L. stylidioides F.Muell.

= Levenhookia pauciflora =

Species of flowering plant

Levenhookia pauciflora, the deceptive stylewort, is a dicotyledonous plant that belongs to the genus Levenhookia (family Stylidiaceae). It is an ephemeral annual that grows from 5–10 centimetres (2.0–3.9 in) tall with ovate to suborbicular leaves. Flowers are white and bloom from September to November in its native range. L. pauciflora is endemic to Western Australia where it grows in sandy soils in sandstone or granitic areas. The flowers of L. pauciflora resemble those of Stylidium ecorne and it has been said that S. ecorne mimics L. pauciflora to take advantage of its pollinators.

== Taxonomy ==
The specific epithet pauciflora, describes the plant as 'few flowered' (in Botanical Latin).
