= Stylidium diceratum =

Conservation status
- Priority One — Poorly Known Taxa (DEC)

Scientific classification
- Kingdom: Plantae
- Clade: Tracheophytes
- Clade: Angiosperms
- Clade: Eudicots
- Clade: Asterids
- Order: Asterales
- Family: Stylidiaceae
- Genus: Stylidium
- Subgenus: Stylidium subg. Centridium
- Species: S. diceratum

Binomial name
- Stylidium diceratum Lowrie & Kenneally 1998

Species of carnivorous plant

Stylidium diceratum is a dicotyledonous plant that belongs to the genus Stylidium (family Stylidiaceae). The specific epithet diceratum is Greek for "two horns", referring to the two appendages that are present on the bend of the gynostemium. It is an annual plant that grows from 15 to 35 cm tall. The longer leaves are lanceolate and the shorter ones are spathulate, forming a basal rosettes around the stem. The leaves are around 5–8 mm long and 0.2-2.5 mm wide. Inflorescences are around 6–15 cm long and produce flowers that are orange with dark orange and pink veins and bloom from June to August in their native range. S. diceratum is only known from the type location, which is at creek crossings on the road to Beverley Springs in the Kimberley region of Western Australia. Its habitat is recorded as being sandy soils on creek margins. It grows in the presence of S. ceratophorum, S. rubriscapum, Drosera caduca, D. paradoxa, Byblis liniflora, and Grevillea pteridifolia. S. diceratum is most closely related to S. longicornu, but it can be confused with S. ceratophorum, which also has an orange corolla but twice as large.

== See also ==
- List of Stylidium species
