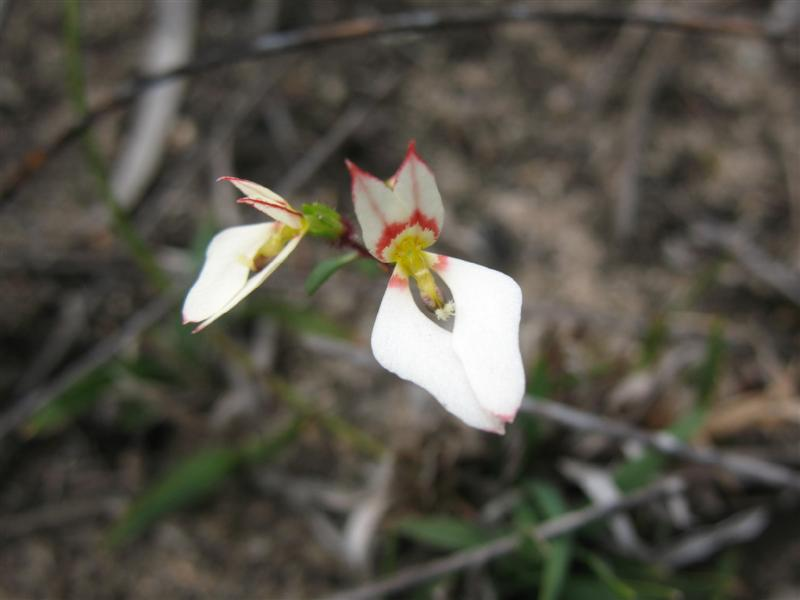
- Levenhookia pauciflora

Scientific classification
- Kingdom: Plantae
- Clade: Tracheophytes
- Clade: Angiosperms
- Clade: Eudicots
- Clade: Asterids
- Order: Asterales
- Family: Stylidiaceae
- Genus: Levenhookia
- Section: L. sect. Levenhookia; R.Br.

Species
- Levenhookia pauciflora; Levenhookia pulcherrima; Levenhookia pusilla

= Levenhookia sect. Levenhookia =

Group of flowering plants

Levenhookia sect. Levenhookia is a section of two to three recognized species in the family Stylidiaceae. Section Levenhookia was originally described by Mildbraed as section Eulevenhookia, which was later changed to the current section title Levenhookia as an autonym since it is the type section. Mildbraed originally placed L. pauciflora and L. pusilla in this section. It could also contain L. pulcherrima, which Carlquist described in 1969 and noted its close association to the other two species in section Levenhookia but neglected to place it within a section.
