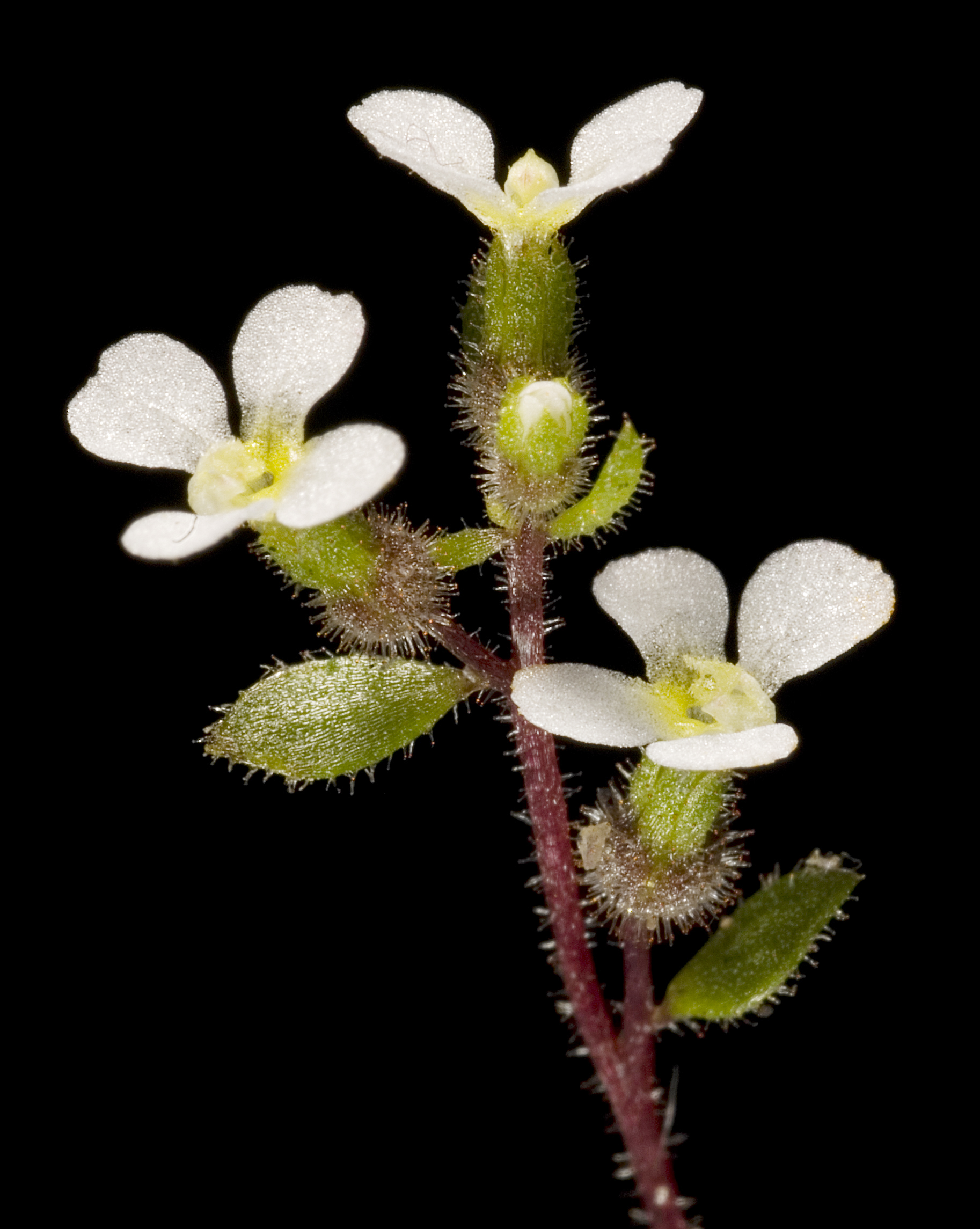

Scientific classification
- Kingdom: Plantae
- Clade: Tracheophytes
- Clade: Angiosperms
- Clade: Eudicots
- Clade: Asterids
- Order: Asterales
- Family: Stylidiaceae
- Genus: Levenhookia
- Section: L. sect. Estipitatae
- Species: L. dubia

Binomial name
- Levenhookia dubia Sond.

Synonyms
- L. creberrima F.Muell.

= Levenhookia dubia =

Species of plant

Levenhookia dubia, the hairy stylewort, is a dicotyledonous plant that belongs to the genus Levenhookia (family Stylidiaceae). It is an ephemeral annual that grows from 2–6 centimetres (0.79–2.36 in) tall with obovate leaves that are generally 2–5 millimetres (0.079–0.197 in) long. Flowers are white and bloom from September to October in its native range. L. dubia is most closely related to L. sonderi, which has been described as a variety of L. dubia in the past. It is endemic to Australia and has native ranges in Western Australia, South Australia, New South Wales, and Victoria. Its habitat has been reported as being sandy soils in granite outcrops.

Levenhookia dubia may have also grown in Tasmania, but is currently listed as extinct there under the Tasmanian Threatened Species Protection Act of 1995. Only one specimen of this species is held by the Tasmanian Herbarium, collected by W. Archer, who listed no date or locality on the specimen sheet. L. Rodway, author of a 1903 assessment of the Tasmanian flora, suggested this species could be found near Brighton, on Mount Field, and on the Bass Strait Islands, but these records are dubious and are not trusted.
