= Stylidium ceratophorum =

Scientific classification
- Kingdom: Plantae
- Clade: Tracheophytes
- Clade: Angiosperms
- Clade: Eudicots
- Clade: Asterids
- Order: Asterales
- Family: Stylidiaceae
- Genus: Stylidium
- Subgenus: Stylidium subg. Centridium
- Species: S. ceratophorum

Binomial name
- Stylidium ceratophorum O.Schwarz 1927

Species of carnivorous plant

Stylidium ceratophorum is a dicotyledonous plant that belongs to the genus Stylidium (family Stylidiaceae). It is an annual plant that is endemic to the Kimberley region of Western Australia and northern parts of the Northern Territory. It attains a height of 12–30 cm with a basal rosette of small leaves. The leaves are petiolate, obovate, or lanceolate and are only 0.2–1 cm long. Solitary scapes are produced that bear golden yellow or orange flowers, 7–9 mm across. Its habitat has been reported as being sandy soils on creek margins in the presence of Stylidium rubriscapum and Stylidium diceratum or in river paperbark (Melaleuca leucodendron) stands. S. ceratophorum appears similar to S. diceratum and may be confused with the species since they both have orange flowers. S. ceratophorum's corolla is twice as large as S. diceratum, though, as well as the deeply divided posterior corolla lobes of S. ceratophorum.

== See also ==
- List of Stylidium species
