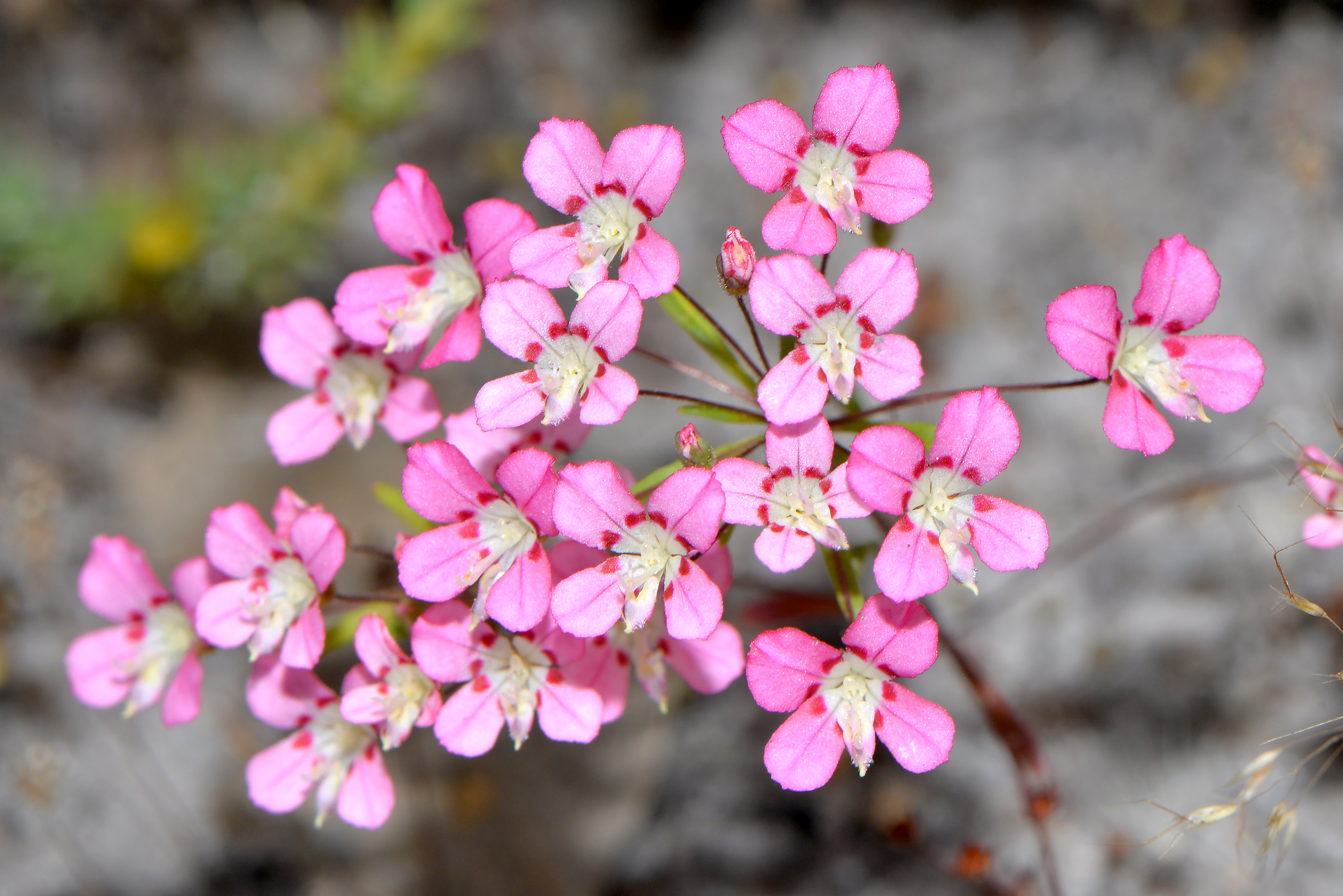

Conservation status
- Priority Three — Poorly Known Taxa (DEC)

Scientific classification
- Kingdom: Plantae
- Clade: Tracheophytes
- Clade: Angiosperms
- Clade: Eudicots
- Clade: Asterids
- Order: Asterales
- Family: Stylidiaceae
- Genus: Levenhookia
- Section: L. sect. Coleostylis
- Species: L. octomaculata

Binomial name
- Levenhookia octomaculata F.L.Erickson & J.H.Willis

= Levenhookia octomaculata =

Species of flowering plant

Levenhookia octomaculata, commonly known as the dotted stylewort or eight-spotted stylewort, is a dicotyledonous plant belonging to the family Stylidiaceae. The specific epithet octomaculata refers to the eight red dots this plant produces on each flower. It is an ephemeral annual that grows from 4–10 centimetres (1.6–3.9 in) tall with a simple or branched stem. There are very few leaves that are obovate to spathulate and mostly around the base of the stem. Scapes are umbellate and dark-coloured. Flowers are bright pink with white throats and two red dots borne on each petal. L. octomaculata blooms from September to October in its native range. It is endemic to Western Australia. Its habitat has been reported as being sandy soils in open Acacia acuminata or Eucalyptus wandoo forests in compact colonies. Because this species is known from several populations that are not believed to be under immediate threat but are poorly known, this species has been declared a priority three species, which means it is under consideration for rare status but more information must be gathered first.
