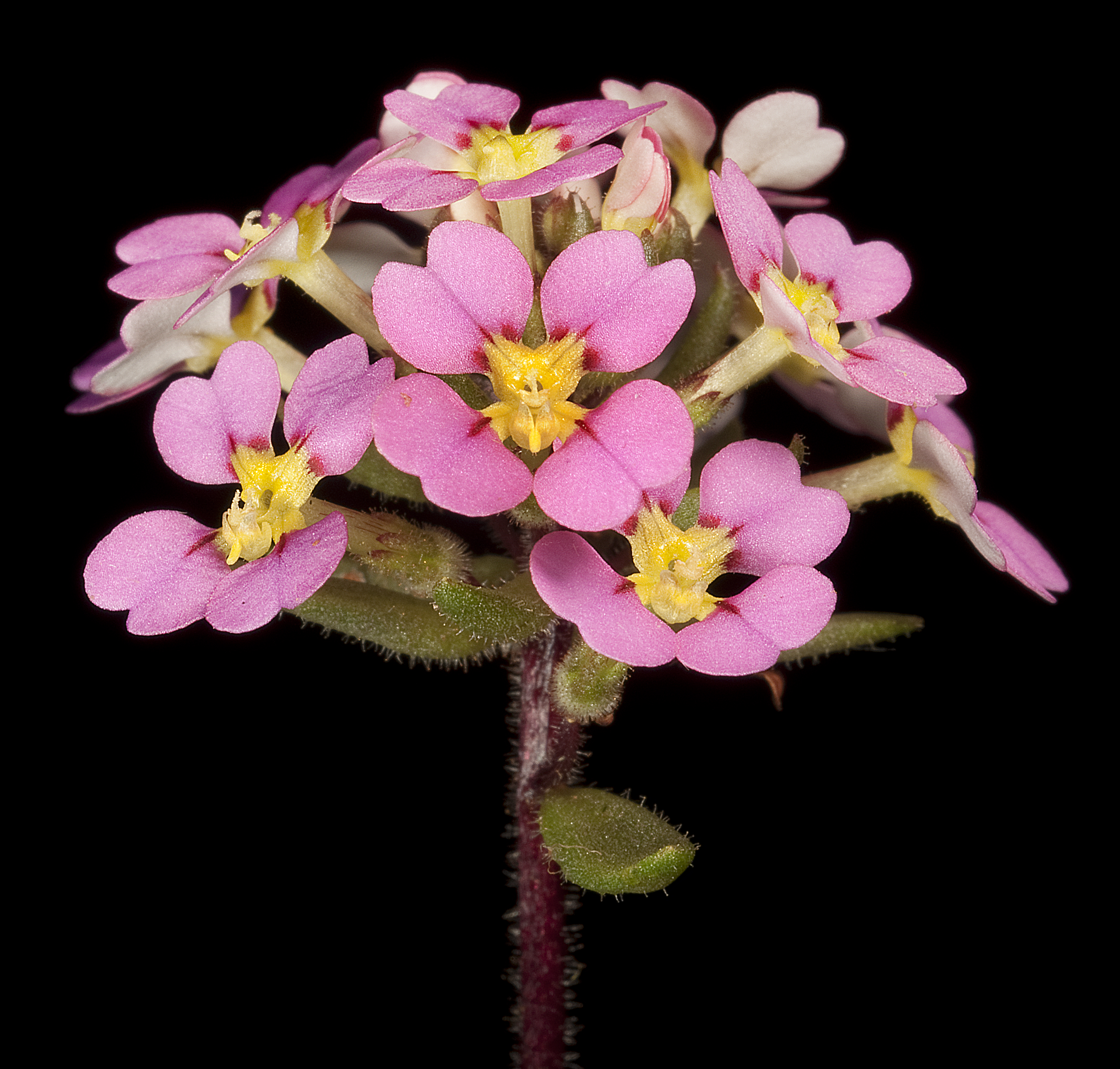

Scientific classification
- Kingdom: Plantae
- Clade: Tracheophytes
- Clade: Angiosperms
- Clade: Eudicots
- Clade: Asterids
- Order: Asterales
- Family: Stylidiaceae
- Genus: Levenhookia
- Section: L. sect. Estipitatae
- Species: L. leptantha

Binomial name
- Levenhookia leptantha Benth.

= Levenhookia leptantha =

Species of flowering plant

Levenhookia leptantha, the trumpet stylewort, is a dicotyledonous plant that belongs to the genus Levenhookia (family Stylidiaceae). It is an ephemeral annual that grows from 2–6 centimetres (0.79–2.36 in) tall with ovate to lanceolate leaves that are generally 2–5 millimetres (0.079–0.197 in) long. Flowers are pink and bloom from September to October in its native range. It is endemic to Western Australia. Its habitat has been reported as being sand or sandy clay soils in granite outcrops and winter-wet depressions.
