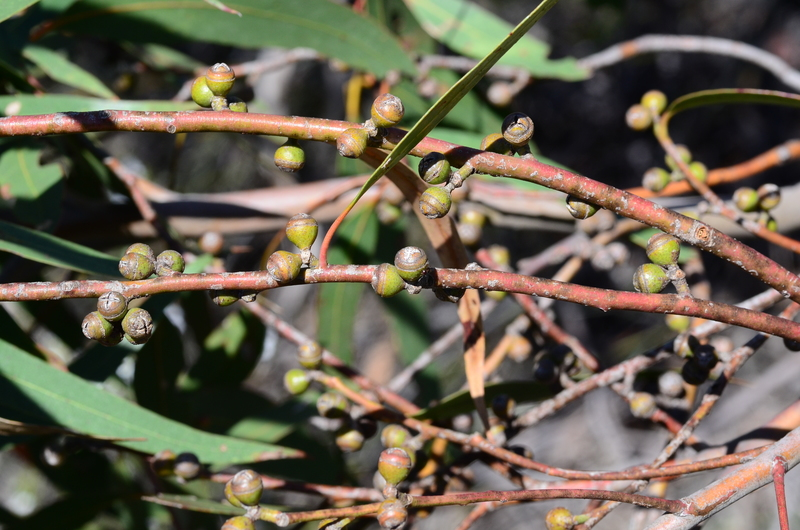
- Fruit of Eucalyptus sabulosa

Conservation status
- Vulnerable (IUCN 3.1)

Scientific classification
- Kingdom: Plantae
- Clade: Tracheophytes
- Clade: Angiosperms
- Clade: Eudicots
- Clade: Rosids
- Order: Myrtales
- Family: Myrtaceae
- Genus: Eucalyptus
- Species: E. sabulosa

Binomial name
- Eucalyptus sabulosa Rule

= Eucalyptus sabulosa =

Wimmera scentbark

Species of eucalyptus

Eucalyptus sabulosa, commonly known as Wimmera scentbark, is a species of small, spreading tree that is endemic to Victoria, Australia. It has fibrous or scaly bark on the trunk and branches, lance-shaped to curved adult leaves, flower buds in groups of seven, white flowers and oval to almost spherical fruit.

== Description ==
Eucalyptus sabulosa is a tree that typically grows to a height of 12–15 m (39–49 ft). It has thick, rough, fibrous or scaly bark on the trunk and branches, smooth, salmon-coloured bark on the thin branches. Young plants have sessile or shortly petiolate, linear to lance-shaped to curved leaves that are 40–90 mm (1.6–3.5 in) long and 5–10 mm (0.20–0.39 in) wide. Adult leaves are lance-shaped to curved, 75–150 mm (3.0–5.9 in) long and 10–20 mm (0.39–0.79 in) wide on a petiole up to 17 mm (0.67 in) long. The flower buds are arranged in leaf axils on an unbranched peduncle up to 10 mm (0.39 in) long, the individual buds on short pedicels. Mature buds are oval or spindle-shaped, up to 5 mm (0.20 in) long and 3 mm (0.12 in) wide with a conical operculum. Flowering occurs from March to April and the flowers are white. The fruit is a woody, oval to more or less spherical capsule up to 6 mm (0.24 in) long and wide with the valves slightly protruding.

== Taxonomy and naming ==
Eucalyptus sabulosa was first formally described in 1996 by Kevin James Rule in the journal Muelleria, from a specimen collected south of Nhill in 1981. The specific epithet (sabulosa) is a Latin word meaning "of the sand", referring to the habitat of this species.

== Distribution ==
This eucalypt occurs in parts of the Grampians and west to Cavendish and the eastern edge of the Little Desert.

== See also ==
- List of Eucalyptus species
