= Levenhookia stipitata =

- Illustration from Johannes Mildbraed's 1908 monograph on the Stylidiaceae.

Scientific classification
- Kingdom: Plantae
- Clade: Tracheophytes
- Clade: Angiosperms
- Clade: Eudicots
- Clade: Asterids
- Order: Asterales
- Family: Stylidiaceae
- Genus: Levenhookia
- Section: L. sect. Coleostylis
- Species: L. stipitata

Binomial name
- Levenhookia stipitata (Sond.) F.Muell.

Synonyms
- Coleostylis umbellulata Sond.; Stylidium stipitatum Benth.

Species of flowering plant

Levenhookia stipitata, the common stylewort, is a dicotyledonous plant that belongs to the genus Levenhookia (family Stylidiaceae). It is an ephemeral annual that grows about 7–10 centimetres (2.8–3.9 in) tall with oblanceolate to linear leaves. Flowers are pink and bloom from August to January in its native range. L. stipitata is endemic to southwestern Western Australia where it grows in granitic or lateritic soils. This species was first described by George Bentham in 1837 as Stylidium stipitatum and was later reclassified into the genus Coleostylis, which was placed into synonymy with the genus Levenhookia.

As of 2007, L. stipitata was reported as being present in the Verran Tanks Conservation Park in South Australia.
