= Levenhookia sect. Coleostylis =

- Levenhookia preissii illustration from Johannes Mildbraed's 1908 monograph on the Stylidiaceae.

Scientific classification
- Kingdom: Plantae
- Clade: Tracheophytes
- Clade: Angiosperms
- Clade: Eudicots
- Clade: Asterids
- Order: Asterales
- Family: Stylidiaceae
- Genus: Levenhookia
- Section: L. sect. Coleostylis; Mildbr.

Species
- Levenhookia chippendalei Levenhookia octomaculata Levenhookia preissii Levenhookia stipitata

Group of flowering plants

Levenhookia sect. Coleostylis is a section of four recognized species in the family Stylidiaceae. It was established and described by Johannes Mildbraed in 1908 to separate the subgeneric taxonomy in the genus Levenhookia. Mildbraed originally placed L. preissii and L. stipitata in this section. L. chippendalei was described in 1966 and placed in this section by Rica Erickson and Jim Willis. Section Coleostylis could also contain L. octomaculata, which Erickson described in 1956, noting its affinities with L. stipitata but without placing it in a section. Otherwise it would be unplaced as to a section.
