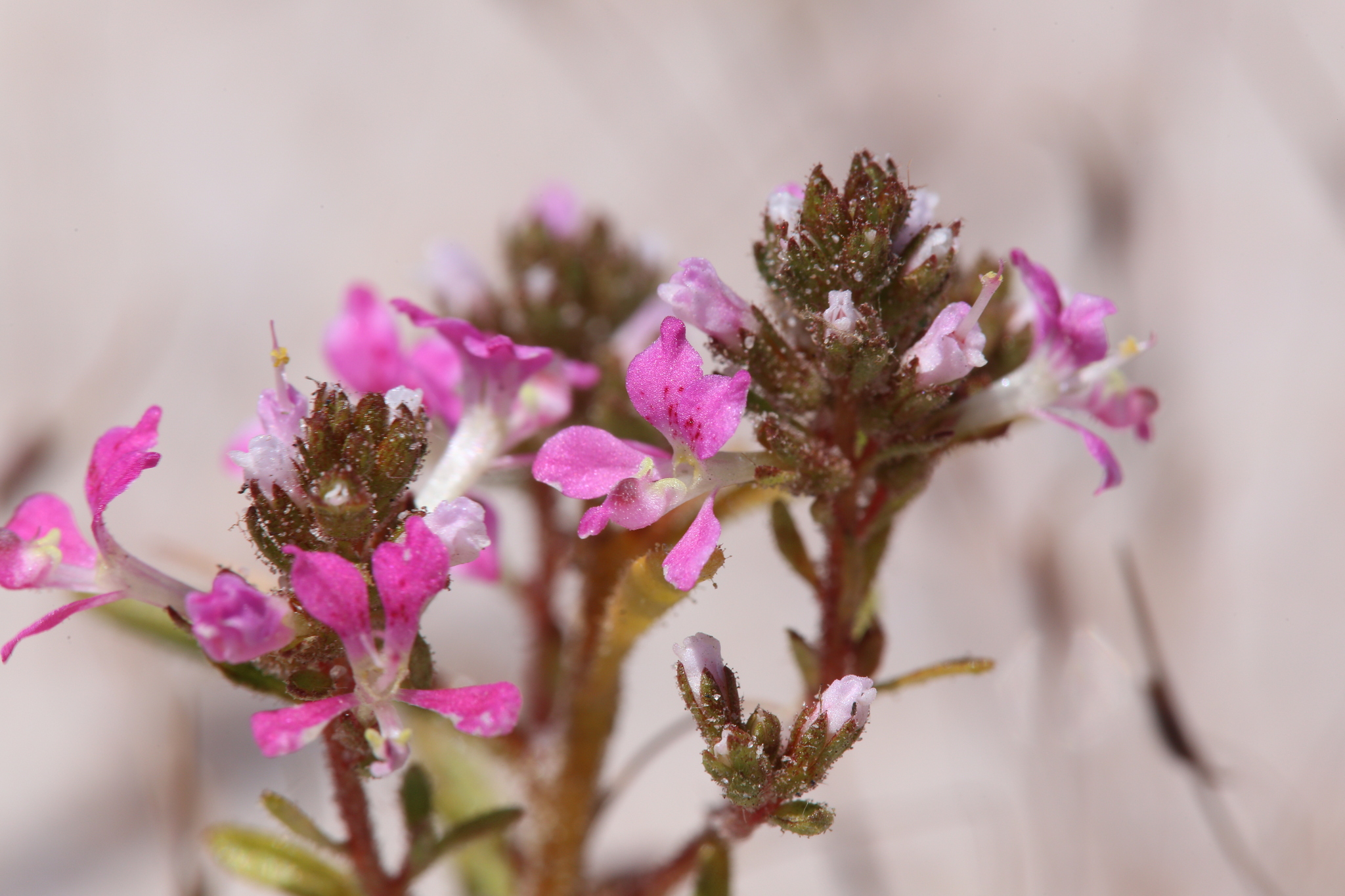

Scientific classification
- Kingdom: Plantae
- Clade: Tracheophytes
- Clade: Angiosperms
- Clade: Eudicots
- Clade: Asterids
- Order: Asterales
- Family: Stylidiaceae
- Genus: Levenhookia
- Section: L. sect. Coleostylis
- Species: L. preissii

Binomial name
- Levenhookia preissii (Sond.) F.Muell.

Synonyms
- Coleostylis preissii Sond.

= Levenhookia preissii =

Species of flowering plant

Levenhookia preissii, commonly known as Preiss's stylewort, is a dicotyledonous species of flowering plant in the family Stylidiaceae.

== Description and habitat ==
Levenhookia preissii is an ephemeral annual that grows about 15 centimetres (5.9 in) tall with oblanceolate to linear leaves. Flowers are pink to red and bloom from September to January in its native range. L. preissii is endemic to southwestern Western Australia where it grows in grey or black sandy peat soils in swampy areas.
