= George Chippendale =

Australian botanist

George McCartney Chippendale (18 April 1921 – 16 February 2010) was an Australian botanist and a strong proponent of growing Australian Native plants. As well as a career in botany, he also taught his love of botany to all who would listen through talks to children, special interest groups, walks on Canberra's Black Mountain and more recently through the U3A (University of the Third Age), both in class and online. He knew the value of planting local native plants in gardens as they would survive local conditions and save water.

Chippendale was born in Sydney, Australia, the eldest of six, and grew up in the Sydney suburb of Paddington. He left school at 14. After a short stint as a draper, his Mother helped him get a job at the Royal Botanic Gardens, Sydney in 1936 as the tea boy. He stayed working at the Gardens until serving in the Australian Army during World War II. In 1943 he married Joan. Post war, he returned to the Gardens and due to his army service, was able to study for a Bachelor of Science at Sydney University. He made lifelong friends at the Gardens who mentored him during his university study and future career. Part of his work at the Gardens was to identify plants brought in by members of the public which gave George a broad background in plant identification.

In 1954 Chippendale moved to Alice Springs with his wife and 3 children as the first resident taxonomist, a job which he loved. When he arrived in Alice Springs only a small collection of specimens existed, these having been gathered by members of CSIRO, various veterinary officers and stock inspectors of the Animal Industry Branch. No public herbarium existed in the Northern Territory at that time and Chippendale's responsibilities extended throughout the Northern Territory. He made many trips into the bush with colleagues and assistants to collect plant specimens. These specimens were the basis for the present Northern Territory Herbarium. As an avid plant specimen collector and describer, George had more than eight plants named after him including: Acacia chippendalei, Bassia chippendalei, Corymbia chippendalei, Levenhookia chippendalei, Minuria chippendalei, Ptilotus chippendalei, Sesbania chippendalei and Solanum chippendalei.

Chippendale's work was aimed at benefiting the pastoral industry, and he secured a special knowledge of the dry country in the Southern half of the Northern Territory. Despite a fourth child and many trips into the bush to collect specimens, he found time to write and publish some 25 papers, one of which was of considerable economic importance to the region, Topfeed; the fodder trees and shrubs of Central Australia. In 1961 Chippendale and family, travelling to visit family in Sydney, were involved in a car accident near Maryborough, Queensland resulting in the loss of his wife and youngest daughter. He suffered many broken bones, but signed himself out of hospital to return to Alice Springs to care for his three elder children.

Chippendale married Thelma (13 February 1921 – 22 August 2011), in 1963 and celebrated the birth of a fifth child prior to moving to Canberra in 1966 to take up the position of senior botanist in the then Forestry Research Institute, which became the Division of Forestry Research, CSIRO. He chose the position over a possible stint as the Director of the Botanic Gardens in Canberra due to his preference to continue with pure botany rather than administrative tasks. His main specialisation became the genus Eucalyptus.

For twelve months during 1972-73 Chippendale became the Botanical Liaison Officer at Kew Gardens in England where he examined type material of Eucalypts, also travelling to several European herbaria to examine similar material. This helped him prepare a technical note, Herbarium Specimens of Eucalyptus Photographed in Europe as well as a record of those who had collected the material.

Chippendale contributed to a steady stream of books either alone or as a collaborator, including: Eucalyptus Buds and Fruit; Illustrations of the Buds and Fruits of the Genus the List of Authentic Specimens from Which the Drawings Were Made (1968), Eucalypts (1969), The Forest Trees of Australia (1970), Australian Rain Forest Trees (1970), Wildflowers of the Australian Capital Territory (1972, with wife Thelma) and Eucalypts of the Western Australian goldfields (and the adjacent wheatbelt) (1973). The Natural Distribution of Eucalyptus in Australia (1981) was completed with George taking advantage of computer generated illustrations (by Ludek Wolf). Using the computer generated illustrations to show where Eucalypts occurred naturally was acknowledged by botanists and others worldwide as a first.

Chippendale's final work was completed in retirement, the sole author of book 19 of the Flora of Australia – Myrtaceae – Eucalypts, Angophora (1988) for which he was awarded a Bicentennial Australia Day Medallion.

Chippendale was survived by 4 children, 10 grandchildren and 4 great-grandchildren.

A plaque was unveiled to celebrate Chippendale's contribution to Australian botany at the Australian National Botanic Gardens on the edge of the Eucalypt Lawn on 9 June 2010. The plaque was unveiled by his wife.
