= Johannes Mildbraed =

German botanist (1879–1954)

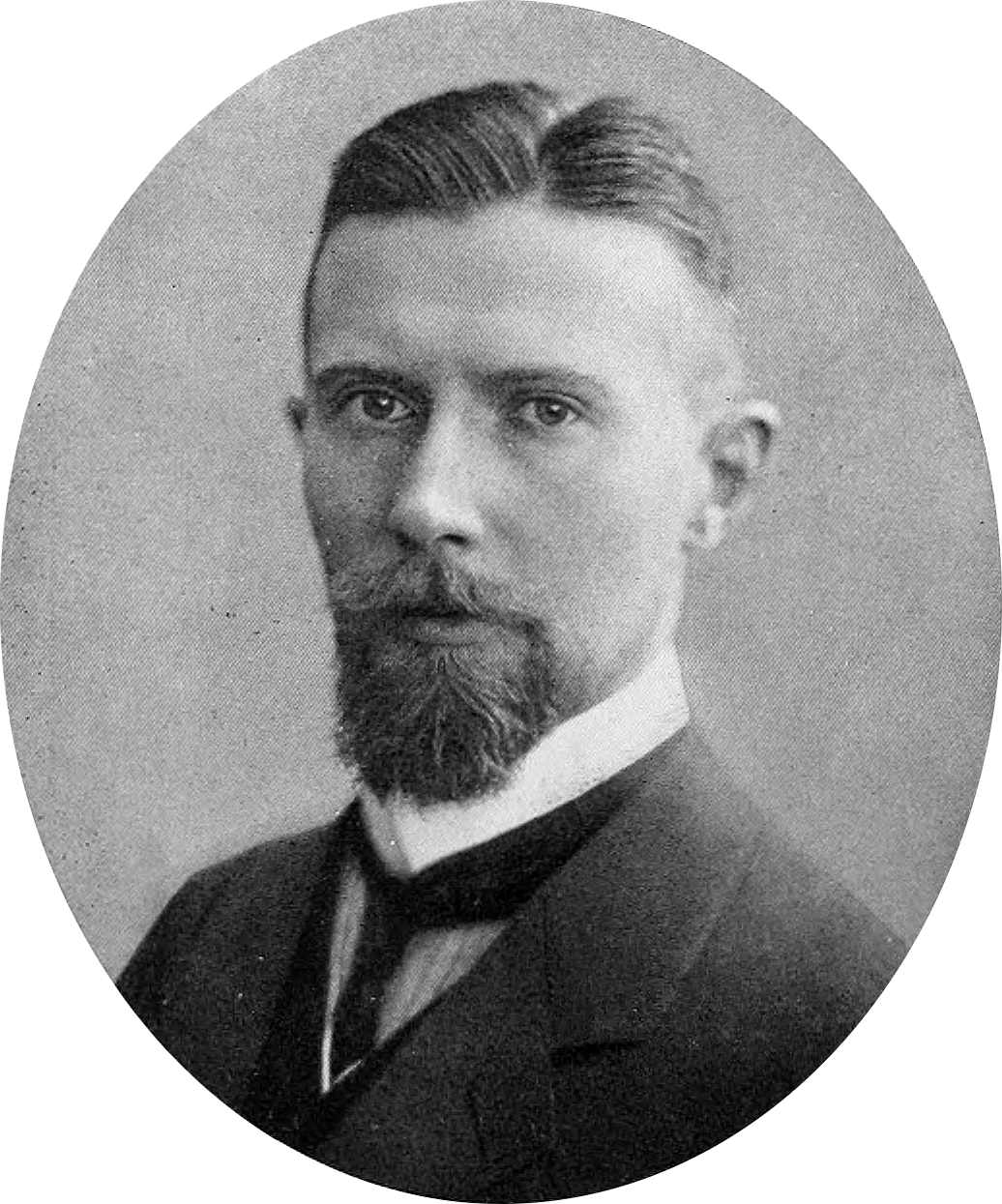
Johannes Mildbraed

Gottfried Wilhelm Johannes Mildbraed (19 December 1879 – 24 December 1954) was a German botanist who specialized in mosses, ferns, and various spermatophytes. He is well known for authoring the most current monograph and taxonomic treatment of the family Stylidiaceae in 1908 as part of the unfinished Das Pflanzenreich series. The genus Mildbraediodendron was named in honor of him.
