= Safir =

Safir may refer to:

- SAFIR, the Single Aperture Far-Infrared Observatory
- Safir (Arthurian legend), a Saracen Knight of the Round Table in the Arthurian legend
- Safir (Belgian beer), a Belgian beer now owned by InBev
- Safir (cycling team), a Belgian professional cycling team known as Safir 1978 and 1985
- Safir (models), a French toy company specializing in 1:43 scale cars and trucks.
- Safir (rocket) an Iranian rocket
- Safir (vehicle), an Iranian made military jeep
- Safir Engineering, a racecar engineering firm
- Saab 91 Safir, a single-engine trainer aircraft

== See also ==
- Saafir
- Saffir
- Shapiro
- Safire (disambiguation)
- Saphir (disambiguation)
- Saphire (disambiguation)
- Sapphire (disambiguation)
- Zafir (disambiguation)
- Zefir (disambiguation)
- Zephir (disambiguation)
- Zephyr (disambiguation)
