= Sapphire (disambiguation) =

Sapphire is a blue gemstone in the corundum family.

Sapphire (s), SAPPHIRE, or The Sapphires may also refer to:

== People ==
- Olga Sapphire (1907–1981), stage name of the Russian-Japanese ballerina born Olga Ivanovna Pavlova
- Sapphire (author), African-American poet and author born Ramona Lofton
- Sapphire (wrestler) or Juanita Wright (1935–1996), professional wrestling valet and wrestler
- Sapphire Elia, British actress

== Places ==
- Sapphire, North Carolina, a community in the US
- Sapphire, Queensland, a town in Australia
- Sapphiretown, South Australia, a locality in Australia
- Istanbul Sapphire, a skyscraper in Istanbul, Turkey

== Animals ==
- Sapphire (horse), 2004 Olympic silver-medal-winning horse
- Sapphire butterfly, the gossamer-winged butterfly of the genus Heliophorus
- Sapphire hummingbird, a name used for several species of hummingbird, including:
  - Blue-chinned sapphire
  - Golden-tailed sapphire
  - Rufous-throated sapphire (Amazilia sapphirina), previously belonged to Hylocharis
  - Sapphire, several hummingbird species in the genus Hylocharis
    - Blue-headed sapphire (Hylocharis grayi)
    - Blue-throated sapphire (Hylocharis eliciae)
    - Flame-rumped sapphire (Hylocharis pyropygia), validity questionable
    - Gilded sapphire (Hylocharis chrysura)
    - Humboldt's sapphire (Hylocharis humboldtii)
    - White-chinned sapphire (Hylocharis cyanus)

== Arts, entertainment, and media ==
=== Fictional characters ===
- Sapphire (character), in the DC Comics universe
- Sapphire, a main character in Pokémon Adventures
- Sapphire, in Sapphire & Steel, a British sci-fi television series
- Sapphire, a character in Steven Universe (Cartoon Network)
- Princess Sapphire, in the manga Princess Knight
- Sapphire Rhodonite, in the video game Disgaea 3: Absence of Justice
- Sapphire Stevens, in the 1920s–1950s radio/film/television series Amos 'n' Andy
- Sapphire Trollzawa, from the syndicated animated series Trollz
- Sapphire Kawashima, a main character in the Sound! Euphonium series

=== Films ===
- Sapphire (film), a 1959 British film starring Nigel Patrick
- The Sapphires (film), a 2012 Australian film
  - The Sapphires (Australian band), subject of the film

=== Games ===
- Ginga Fukei Densetsu Sapphire, a 1995 video game for the PC Engine
- Pokémon Sapphire, a 2002 video game for the Game Boy Advance
- Pokémon Alpha Sapphire, a 2014 remake of Pokémon Sapphire for the Nintendo 3DS

=== Music ===
==== Groups ====
- Sapphire, a band that includes members of the band Alyson Avenue
- The Sapphires (American band), a 1960s American pop group
- The Sapphires (Australian band), a 1960s Aboriginal Australian trio of female singers
- The Sapphhires (backing vocalists), a 1950s male Australian trio of backing singers, worked with Col Joye

==== Albums ====
- Sapphire (John Martyn album), 1984
- Sapphire (Teena Marie album), 2006
- Sapphire, a 1995 album by the Japanese jazz musician Keiko Matsui

==== Songs ====
- "Sapphire", an instrumental piece by Norwegian band TNT from the 1987 album Tell No Tales
- "Sapphire" (song), a 2025 song by Ed Sheeran

== Brands, enterprises, groups, organizations ==
- Sapphire (books), a British book publisher
- Sapphire Retail, a Pakistani fashion brand and clothing retailer
- Bombay Sapphire, a brand of London dry gin produced by the Bombay Spirits Company
- Chase Sapphire Preferred Visa, an Ultimate Rewards Visa Signature credit card of JPMorgan Chase
- Chase Sapphire Reserve Visa, an elite Ultimate Rewards Visa Infinite credit card of JPMorgan Chase similar to the JPMorgan Reserve that replaced the Palladium Card, in 2016
- Sapphire Energy, an energy company that produces oil made from algae
- Sapphire Gentlemen's Club, a chain of adult entertainment venues
- Sapphire Ventures, a venture capital firm
- Sapphire, the rape investigation unit of the Metropolitan Police Service of Greater London, UK
- SAPPHIRE, a human resource management committee of XLRI Jamshedpur

== Computing ==
- Sapphire Technology, a manufacturer of PC hardware
- SAPPHIRE (Health care), a health information system based on Semantic Web and RDF language
- SAPPHIRE, SAP's customer-facing event
- Sapphire Worm, another name for the SQL slammer worm

== Celebrations and jubilees ==
- Sapphire jubilee, a celebration to mark a 65th anniversary
- Sapphire Jubilee of Queen Elizabeth II, commemoration of the 65th year of Queen Elizabeth's reign

== Transportation and vehicles ==
=== Aerospace ===
- Sapphire (satellite), a Canadian space surveillance satellite launched in 2013
- Armstrong Siddeley Sapphire, a jet engine also known as the Wright J65
- Sapphire Aircraft Australia Sapphire LSA, an Australian ultralight aircraft

=== Ships ===
- HMS Sapphire, the name of several ships of the British Royal Navy
- USS Sapphire, more than one US Navy ship
- Mermaid Sapphire, a multipurpose oceanic support ship, dive support ship, ROV support ship, run by Mermaid Services

=== Ground transport ===
- Sapphire (train), (German: Saphir) a European express train
- Arriva Sapphire, a premium brand of Arriva bus services in the UK
- Armstrong Siddeley Sapphire (motor car), a series of UK post-war cars
- Ford Sapphire, a sedan version of the Ford Sierra, sold in South Africa and the UK
- Lucid Air Sapphire, a model of luxury sedan

== Sports ==
- Sapphires (Super Fours), a women's cricket team that competed in the Super Fours
- Sapphire Stakes (ATC), an Australian horse race

== Other uses ==
- Sapphire (color), an intense shade of blue
- Sapphire, an African-American stereotype also called angry black woman

== See also ==
- Saffire – The Uppity Blues Women, a three-woman blues band
- Safire (disambiguation)
- Saphir (disambiguation)
- Saphire (disambiguation)
- Sapphire & Steel, a British television science-fiction fantasy series (1979 to 1982)
- Zefir (disambiguation)
- Zephir (disambiguation)
- Zephyr (disambiguation)
