= Safire =

Safire may refer to:

- Sa-Fire (born 1966), American vocalist
- Safire (illusionists), a British illusion act
- Safire Theatre complex, in Chennai, India
- William Safire (1929–2009), American journalist and speechwriter
- South African Identity Federation; see TENET (network)

== See also ==
- Saffire – The Uppity Blues Women, a three-woman blues band
- Safir (disambiguation)
- Saphir (disambiguation)
- Saphire (disambiguation)
- Sapphire (disambiguation)
- Zefir (disambiguation)
- Zephir (disambiguation)
- Zephyr (disambiguation)
