= Saphire =

Saphire may refer to:

- SAPHIRE, Systems Analysis Programs for Hands-on Integrated Reliability Evaluations
- Saphire Longmore (born 1976), Jamaican politician and former model
- Erica Ollmann Saphire, U.S. biologist
- Stylidium graminifolium 'Little Saphire', a commercial cultivar of grass triggerplant

== See also ==
- Saffire – The Uppity Blues Women, a three-woman blues band
- Safire (disambiguation)
- Saphir (disambiguation)
- Sapphire, a gemstone
- Sapphire (disambiguation)
- Zefir (disambiguation)
- Zephir (disambiguation)
- Zephyr (disambiguation)
