= Saphir =

Saphir, meaning sapphire in several languages, may refer to:

- Saphir (band), a German pop group
- Saphir (rocket), a French sounding rocket
- Saphir (train), a German train
- Jacob Saphir (1822–1886), Russian-Jewish ethnographer, writer, and traveller
- Moritz Gottlieb Saphir (1795–1858), Austrian-Jewish writer
- Saphir Taïder, Algerian football player
- Blue Saphir, a character in the Japanese anime Sailor Moon
- French submarine Saphir, any of four vessels of the French Navy
- Saphir (ship), a French slave ship
- SAPHIR (Sounder for Probing Vertical Profiles of Humidity), an instrument on the Megha-Tropiques spacecraft

== See also ==
- Safire (disambiguation)
- Sapir (disambiguation)
- Sapphire (disambiguation)
- Saphire (disambiguation)
- Zefir (disambiguation)
- Zephir (disambiguation)
- Zephyr (disambiguation)
