= Zephyr (ship) =

Several ships have Zephyr for the light wind.

- Zephyr (1781 ship) was built at Whitby in 1781. She was abandoned in 1840.
- Zephyr (1790 ship) was built on the River Thames in 1790 as a West Indiaman. From c.1796 she started to serve the British East India Company (EIC) as a packet ship. However, a French privateer captured her in 1798.
- Zephyr (1796 ship) was a vessel built at Hull in 1796. She initially traded with the Baltic, though for a year or so she was a London-based transport. From 1810 she made 27 voyages as a whaler in the northern whale fishery. She returned to mercantile trade and was last listed in 1853.
- Zephyr (1810 ship), was a vessel built in the United States in 1810 or 1811 that came into British hands circa 1813. Between 1814 and 1840, when she was lost, she made eight voyages as a whaler in the southern whale fishery.
- Zephyr (1816 ship) was launched at Sunderland. Her crew abandoned her in 1840.
- Zephyr (schooner), an 1842 opium clipper
- Zephyr (steamboat), a sternwheel steamboat of the Puget Sound Mosquito Fleet
- RV Zephyr, research vessel

== See also ==
- HMS Zephyr – one of nine vessels of the Royal Navy
- USS Zephyr is a Cyclone-class patrol coastal ship in the United States Navy.
