= ATEC 212 Solo =

212 Solo

General information
- Type: Ultralight aircraft
- National origin: Czech Republic
- Manufacturer: ATEC v.o.s.
- Status: In production

The ATEC 212 Solo is a Czech ultralight aircraft, designed and produced by ATEC v.o.s. of Libice nad Cidlinou. The aircraft is supplied as a complete ready-to-fly-aircraft.

== Design and development ==
The aircraft was designed to comply with the Fédération Aéronautique Internationale microlight rules. It features a cantilever low-wing, a single-seat, enclosed cockpit with a bubble canopy, fixed conventional landing gear and a single engine in tractor configuration.

The 212 Solo is made from carbon fibre and was derived from the ATEC 321 Faeta and ATEC 122 Zephyr 2000 designs. Its 7.48 m (24.5 ft) span wing employs an SM701 airfoil and slotted flaps. Standard engines available are the 64 hp (48 kW) Rotax 582 two-stroke and the 80 hp (60 kW) Rotax 912UL four-stroke powerplant.

== Specifications (212 Solo) ==
Data from Bayerl

General characteristics

- Crew: one
- Wingspan: 7.48 m (24 ft 6 in)
- Wing area: 7.27 m^{2} (78.3 sq ft)
- Empty weight: 200 kg (441 lb)
- Gross weight: 315 kg (694 lb)
- Fuel capacity: 50 litres (11 imp gal; 13 US gal)
- Powerplant: 1 × Rotax 582 twin cylinder, liquid-cooled, two stroke, 48 kW (64 hp)
- Propellers: 3-bladed composite

Performance

- Maximum speed: 250 km/h (160 mph, 130 kn)
- Cruise speed: 220 km/h (140 mph, 120 kn)
- Stall speed: 65 km/h (40 mph, 35 kn)
- Rate of climb: 7 m/s (1,400 ft/min)
- Wing loading: 43.32 kg/m^{2} (8.87 lb/sq ft)
