= Zafira =

Zafira may refer to:

- Opel Zafira
- Zaphira (died 1516), alleged wife of Selim al-Toumi, Emir of Algiers
- Zafire Hatun (c.1620s–1645/1646), slave in the Ottoman imperial harem and favourite of sultan Ibrahim
- Kollár Bettina (born 1984), Hungarian pornographic actress and model known as Zafira

== See also ==
- Safira (disambiguation)
- Zarifa
