= Zafir =

Zafir or al-Zafir may refer to:

- Al-Zafir, a Fatimid caliph from 1149 to 1154
- Al-Ẓafīr, an ancient Arabian tribe
- Az Zafir, a village in western central Yemen
- Al-Zafir (missile), a short-range ballistic missile

== People with the name ==
- Zafir Patel (born 1992), Indian cricketer
- Zafir Premčević (1872—1937), Serbian Chetnik commander

== See also ==
- Safir (disambiguation)
- Zafira (disambiguation)
