= List of shipwrecks in April 1840 =

The list of shipwrecks in April 1840 includes ships sunk, foundered, wrecked, grounded, or otherwise lost during April 1840.

== 1 April ==
List of shipwrecks: 1 April 1840
Ship	State	Description
Paragon	United Kingdom	The ship was driven ashore and wrecked at Green Point, Cape Town, Cape Colony. She was on a voyage from Mauritius to London.
Psyche	United Kingdom	The ship was driven ashore in the River Carron. She was on a voyage from Grangemouth, Stirlingshire, to Stockton-on-Tees, County Durham.
Splendid	United Kingdom	The ship ran aground at Beaumaris, Anglesey. She was on a voyage from Bangor, Caernarfonshire, to London.
Wells	United Kingdom	The ship was driven ashore and wrecked north of Hartlepool, County Durham. Her crew were rescued.
Zephyr	United Kingdom	The whaler ran aground of a reef off Borneo, Spanish East Indies. Her crew abandoned the ship on 3 April and set fire to her. They reached "Macassa Island" and were then found a ship to take them to Batavia, Netherlands East Indies.

== 2 April ==
List of shipwrecks: 2 April 1840
Ship	State	Description
Acht Gebroders	Netherlands	The ship was wrecked on the Île de Planier, Bouches-du-Rhône, France. Her crew were rescued. She was on a voyage from Amsterdam, North Holland, to Marseille, Bouches-du-Rhône.
Experiment	(United Kingdom of Great Britain and Ireland) British North America	The ship was driven ashore on Campobello Island, New Brunswick. She was on a voyage from Havana, Cuba, to Saint John, New Brunswick.
Thomas Beaufort	United Kingdom	The ship was driven ashore at Sheerness, Kent. She was refloated on 3 April.

== 3 April ==
List of shipwrecks: 3 April 1840
Ship	State	Description
Athenais	Flag unknown	The ship was driven ashore and damaged at Gibraltar. She was refloated.
Catherine	France	The ship was run down and sunk in the English Channel by Oceanus (United States) with the loss of all but one of her crew.
Hope	United Kingdom	The ship was driven ashore at Carbonear, Newfoundland, British North America. She was on a voyage from Bristol, Gloucestershire, to Carbonear and Saint John's, Newfoundland.
Ino	United Kingdom	The ship ran aground on the Middle Bank, in the Solent. She was on a voyage from Hartlepool, County Durham, to Portsmouth, Hampshire.
Isabella	United Kingdom	The ship was destroyed by fire at sea. Her crew were rescued.
Joseph Tyson	United Kingdom	The ship was driven ashore on the Algarve coast, Portugal. She had been refloated by 23 April.
Sleepless	United Kingdom	The ship was driven ashore at Sunderland, County Durham. She was refloated on 5 April and put back to Sunderland.
Tweed	United Kingdom	The ship capsized at Liverpool, Lancashire.

== 5 April ==
List of shipwrecks: 5 April 1840
Ship	State	Description
Vrow Gebina	Netherlands	The ship was wrecked on the Poldern Sandbank, in the North Sea off the mouth of the Eider. She was on a voyage from Groningen to a Baltic port.

== 6 April ==
List of shipwrecks: 6 April 1840
Ship	State	Description
Creole	(United Kingdom of Great Britain and Ireland) Grenada	The schooner was wrecked on the Recas. Her crew were rescued. She was on a voyage from Grenada to Curaçao.
John and Susan	United Kingdom	The ship ran aground on the Barber Sand, in the North Sea off the coast of Norfolk. She was on a voyage from Newcastle upon Tyne, Northumberland, to Shoreham-by-Sea, Sussex. John and Susan was refloated and taken into Great Yarmouth, Norfolk.
Minerva	Netherlands	The ship was wrecked on the English coast. She was on a voyage from a Dutch port to Philadelphia, Pennsylvania, United States. Three crew reached Guernsey, Channel Islands, in a boat on 10 April.
Princess Victoria	United Kingdom	The ship was driven ashore at Rye, Sussex. She was on a voyage drom London to Rio de Janeiro, Brazil. Princess Victoria was refloated and resumed her voyage.
Surrey	United Kingdom	The ship was abandoned in the Atlantic Ocean. Her crew were rescued by Daring (United Kingdom). Surrey was on a voyage from Sierra Leone to Plymouth, Devon.

== 7 April ==
List of shipwrecks: 7 April 1840
Ship	State	Description
Hudscott	United Kingdom	The ship was driven ashore on St Margaret's Island, Pembrokeshire.
Jane	United Kingdom	The ship was driven ashore and sank near Huntcliffe, County Durham Her crew were rescued by the Redcar Lifeboat. She was on a voyage from Newcastle upon Tyne to Stockton-on-Tees.
Jane	United Kingdom	The ship was driven ashore and damaged at Milford Haven, Pembrokeshire. She was refloated on 10 April and taken into Milford Haven.
Maitland	(United Kingdom of Great Britain and Ireland) British North America	The ship ran aground on Brownie's Island Reef and was wrecked with the loss of three of her nineteen crew.
Mary Ann	United Kingdom	The smack was driven ashore and wrecked at Pedan Olva Point, Cornwall. Both crew members were rescued. She was on a voyage from Swansea, Glamorgan, to Poole, Dorset.
New Hope	United Kingdom	The ship struck a rock and sank at Fishguard, Pembrokeshire.
Polly	United Kingdom	The brig was wrecked on Rat Island, off Lundy Island, Devon. Her crew were rescued by HMRC Endeavour ( Board of Customs). Polly was on a voyage from Cork to Caernarfon.

== 8 April ==
List of shipwrecks: 8 April 1840
Ship	State	Description
Glasgow	United Kingdom	The ship was driven ashore at King's Lynn, Norfolk. She was on a voyage from London to Inverness.
Joseph and Ann	United Kingdom	The ship was driven ashore at Harwich, Essex. She was later refloated.
Lydia	United Kingdom	The ship was driven ashore at Eastbourne, Sussex. She was on a voyage from Singapore to London. Lydia was refloated the next day and taken into Seaford, Sussex.

== 9 April ==
List of shipwrecks: 9 April 1840
Ship	State	Description
Artaxerxes	France	The ship was wrecked on the north coast of Menorca, Spain, with the loss of 29 lives. She was on a voyage from Cette, Hérault to Algiers, Algeria.
Caroline	United Kingdom	The brig was driven ashore at Mauritius.
Cervantes	United Kingdom	The brig was driven ashore at Mauritius.
Cove	United Kingdom	The ship was driven ashore at Mauritius.
Deux Frères	(France) Mauritius	The coaster capsized and sank at Mauritius.
Esperance	(France) Mauritius	The ship sank at Port Louis, Mauritius with the loss of all eight crew.
George McCloud	United Kingdom	The brig was driven ashore at Mauritius. She was refloated.
Gregorio	(France) Mauritius	The schooner was damaged at Mauritius.
Jeune Ferdinand	(France) Mauritius	The coaster sank at Mauritius.
Laurencia	United Kingdom	The brig was driven ashore at Mauritius.
Louise	(France) Mauritius	The coaster capsized and sank at Mauritius.
Lynhersand	(France) Mauritius	The schooner was damaged at Mauritius.
Patriot	United Kingdom	The barque was driven ashore and wrecked at Mauritius. Her crew survived.
Reform	United Kingdom	The brig was run into by Stratford (United Kingdom) at Mauritius and was severely damaged.
Revenant	(France) Mauritius	The coaster capsized and sank at Mauritius.
Sarah Doyle	United Kingdom	The ship was wrecked on Skokholm, Pembrokeshire. Her crew were rescued. She was on a voyage from Bristol, Gloucestershire, to Liverpool, Lancashire.
St. Jean	(France) Mauritius	The coaster capsized and sank at Mauritius.
Stratford	United Kingdom	The barque was driven ashore at Mauritius.
Vrai Francais	France	The barque was driven ashore at Mauritius.

== 11 April ==
List of shipwrecks: 11 April 1840
Ship	State	Description
Cordelia	United Kingdom	The ship ran aground on the Pennington Spit, in the Solent.
Eclipse	United Kingdom	The ship ran aground on the Pennington Spit.
Repeal	United Kingdom	The brigantine sprang a leak and was beached on Cross Island, Maine, United States. She was abandoned by her crew. She was on a voyage from Saint John, New Brunswick, British North America, to Cork.

== 12 April ==
List of shipwrecks: 12 April 1840
Ship	State	Description
Paulina	Danzig	The ship struck a rock and foundered off the "Isle of Glass". She was on a voyage from Danzig to Belfast, County Antrim, United Kingdom.

== 13 April ==
List of shipwrecks: 13 April 1840
Ship	State	Description
Indien	France	The ship ran aground in the Ganges and was wrecked. She was on a voyage from Calcutta, India, to Havre de Grâce, Seine-Inférieure.
Pauline	Danzig	The ship was wrecked off the Isle of Lewis, Outer Hebrides, United Kingdom. She was on a voyage from Danzig to Belfast, County Antrim, United Kingdom.
Terpisichore	Hamburg	The ship ran aground on the Morven Sand and was severely damaged. She was on a voyage from New Orleans, Louisiana, United States, to Cuxhaven. Terpsichore was refloated and resumed her voyage.

== 14 April ==
List of shipwrecks: 14 April 1840
Ship	State	Description
Bonito	United Kingdom	The ship was holed by her anchor and sank in the River Tyne at South Shields, County Durham. She was refloated on 20 April and beached in a severely damaged condition.
Emmanuel	United Kingdom	The ship capsized in the River Tyne at South Shields.
Johannes	Hamburg	The ship sprang a leak and was beached near "Harlingenhafen". She was on a voyage from Hamburg to Riga, Russia.
Wave	United Kingdom	The ship was driven ashore at Latakia, Syria. She was on a voyage from Beirut to Alexandretta, Ottoman Empire.

== 15 April ==
List of shipwrecks: 15 April 1840
Ship	State	Description
Brighton	United Kingdom	The ship was holed by her anchor and sank at Penarth, Glamorgan. She was on a voyage from Shoreham-by-Sea, Sussex, to Penarth. Brighton was refloated and taken into Cardiff, Glamorgan, for repairs.
Brompton	United Kingdom	The ship struck the Whitby Rock and sank.
Deux Sœurs	France	The whaler foundered in the Atlantic Ocean with the loss of all hands.
Janet Towers	United Kingdom	The ship ran aground at Ballyshannon, County Donegal. She was taken into Mullaghmore, where she sank.

== 16 April ==
List of shipwrecks: 16 April 1840
Ship	State	Description
Exchange	United Kingdom	The schooner was wrecked on Stroma in the Pentland Firth. Her crew survived. She was on a voyage from Newcastle upon Tyne, Northumberland, to Glasgow, Renfrewshire.
Voluna	United Kingdom	The ship was driven ashore at Padstow, Cornwall. She was on a voyage from Padstow to Quebec City, Lower Canada, British North America. Voluna was refloated and taken into Padstow.

== 17 April ==
List of shipwrecks: 17 April 1840
Ship	State	Description
Carouge	United Kingdom	The ship was destroyed by fire at Londonderry.
Exchange	United Kingdom	The ship struck the south west point of Swanna, Orkney Islands, and sank. Her crew were rescued. She was on a voyage from Newcastle upon Tyne, Northumberland, to Glasgow, Renfrewshire.
Jacob Pennell	United Kingdom	The ship ran aground on the Long Bank, in the Irish Sea off the coast of County Wexford. She was on a voyage from Liverpool, Lancashire, to New York, United States. Jacob Pennell was later refloated.
Mandarin	France	The ship was lost at "St. Leu".
Robert Bruce	United Kingdom	The ship ran aground on the Long Bank. She was on a voyage from Liverpool to Cork. She was refloated and arrived at Cork on 23 April.
Winscales	p	The ship ran aground at Maryport, Cumberland. She was on a voyage from Sierra Leone to Maryport.

== 18 April ==
List of shipwrecks: 18 April 1840
Ship	State	Description
Louisa	United Kingdom	The ship was driven ashore and wrecked at Ballyshannon, County Donegal.
Lydia	United Kingdom	The ship was driven ashore south of Campbeltown, Argyllshire. She was on a voyage from Gijón, Spain, to Glasgow, Renfrewshire.

== 19 April ==
List of shipwrecks: 19 April 1840
Ship	State	Description
James	United Kingdom	The ship ran aground at Maryport, Cumberland. She was on a voyage from Belfast, County Antrim, to Maryport.
Uitreding	Netherlands	The ship was driven ashore and severet damaged on Lolland, Denmark. She was on a voyage from Greifswald to a Dutch port. Uitreding was refloated on 27 April and taken into Rødby.

== 20 April ==
List of shipwrecks: 20 April 1840
Ship	State	Description
Belle	United Kingdom	The ship was sunk by ice in the Bay of Riga. Her crew were rescued. She was on a voyage from Riga, Russian Empire, to Hull, Yorkshire.
Pauline	France	The ship capsized in the Bay of Palamos. Her crew were rescued.

== 22 April ==
List of shipwrecks: 22 April 1840
Ship	State	Description
Bee	United Kingdom	The ship was driven ashore in the Cantach Sound.
Scotia	United Kingdom	The schooner was wrecked on Canna, Inner Hebrides. Her crew were rescued. She was on a voyage from Glasgow, Renfrewshire, to Hull, Yorkshire.

== 23 April ==
List of shipwrecks: 23 April 1840
Ship	State	Description
Amanda	Netherlands	The ship was driven ashore at Ramsgate, Kent, United Kingdom. She was on a voyage from Rotterdam, South Holland, to the Cape of Good Hope. Amanda was refloated and taken into Ramsgate.
Hope	United Kingdom	The ship struck a sunken rock and was damaged at Carbonear, Newfoundland, British North America. She was on a voyage from Bristol, Gloucestershire, to Carbonear and Saint Johns, Newfoundland.
Wismar	Wismar	The ship was driven ashore at Formby Point, Lancashire, United Kingdom. She was on a voyage from Wismar to Liverpool, Lancashire. Wismar was refloated and taken into Liverpool.

== 24 April ==
List of shipwrecks: 24 April 1840
Ship	State	Description
Emerald	United Kingdom	The ship caught fire in Lough Swilly and was scuttled.
Neptune	Spain	The ship ran aground at Thisted, Denmark. She was on a voyage from Cádiz to Helsingfors, Grand Duchy of Finland.

== 25 April ==
List of shipwrecks: 25 April 1840
Ship	State	Description
Bedford	United States	The steamboat struck a submerged object and sank in the Missouri River with the loss of seven lives.
Byron	United Kingdom	The full-rigged ship ran aground at New Orleans, Louisiana, United States.
Polack	United Kingdom	The barque ran aground at New Orleans.
Rapid	United Kingdom	The ship ran aground on a reef north west of Aalborg, Denmark. She was on a voyage from Liverpool, Lancashire, to Stettin. Rapid was later refloated.
Robert	Netherlands	The ship was driven ashore near Rixhöft, Prussia.
Shakespeare	United Kingdom	The full-rigged ship ran aground at New Orleans.

== 26 April ==
List of shipwrecks: 26 April 1840
Ship	State	Description
Bee	United Kingdom	The ship ran aground off Longhope, Orkney Islands. Her crew were rescued. She was on a voyage from Thurso, Caithness, to Newcastle upon Tyne, Northumberland.

== 27 April ==
List of shipwrecks: 27 April 1840
Ship	State	Description
Aurora	(United Kingdom of Great Britain and Ireland) New Zealand	The barque struck a rock and was wrecked at Kaipara Harbour. Her crew were rescued.

== 28 April ==
List of shipwrecks: 28 April 1840
Ship	State	Description
Mercury	United Kingdom	The ship was driven ashore at Dundee, Forfarshire. She was on a voyage from Dundee to Copenhagen, Denmark. Mercury was refloated and resumed her voyage.

== 29 April ==
List of shipwrecks: 29 April 1840
Ship	State	Description
Peace	United Kingdom	The ship ran aground on The Shingles, off The Needles, Isle of Wight. She was on a voyage from São Miguel Island, Azores, to Southampton, Hampshire. Peace was later refloated and taken into Southampton.

== 30 April ==
List of shipwrecks: 30 April 1840
Ship	State	Description
Chippewa	United Kingdom	The barque was driven ashore and wrecked near Cap-des-Rosiers, with the loss of all but two of the 24 people on board. She was on a voyage from Greenock, Renfrewshire, to Montreal, Lower Canada, British North America.
Elizabeth	(United Kingdom of Great Britain and Ireland) Grenada	The cutter was wrecked in Latarde Bay.

== Unknown date ==
List of shipwrecks: Unknown date in April 1840
Ship	State	Description
Albion	United Kingdom	The collier was driven ashore at Dieppe, Seine-Inférieure, France. She had been refloated and taken into Dieppe by 4 April.
Aurora Frederica	Flag unknown	The ship ran aground at La Rochelle, Charente-Maritime, France before 8 April.
Eagle	(United Kingdom of Great Britain and Ireland) New South Wales	The schooner struck a rock and foundered in Whirlpool Reach, in the Tamar River.
Margaret	United Kingdom	The ship was driven ashore in Busika Bay before 25 April. She was refloated an put into Tenedos, Ottoman Empire.
Naiad	United Kingdom	The ship ran aground in the Dardanelles before 4 April. She was later refloated.
Navarino	(United Kingdom of Great Britain and Ireland) New South Wales	The ship was wrecked on the coast of New Zealand.
Orion	United Kingdom	The ship was lost off "Cape St. Rocque" before 23 April. She was on a voyage from Cap-Haïtien, Haiti to the Cape of Good Hope, Africa.
Peace	United Kingdom	The ship ran aground on The Shingles, off The Needles, Isle of Wight, and was abandoned by her crew. She was on a voyage from São Miguel Island, Azores, to Southampton, Hampshire. Peace was later refloated and taken into Southampton.
Robert	United Kingdom	The ship was sunk by ice in Riga Bay between 3 and 21 April.
Snire	United Kingdom	The ship was driven ashore near Llanmadoc, Glamorgan. She was refloated on 3 April and towed into Llanelly.
Star	United Kingdom	The ship was abandoned in the North Sea off Lindisfarne, Northumberland. She was subsequently taken into North Sunderland, County Durham.
