= Zephyr =

In European tradition, a zephyr is a light wind or a west wind, named after Zephyrus, the Greek god or personification of the west wind.

Zephyr may also refer to:

== Arts and media ==
=== Fictional characters ===
- Zephyr (comics), in the Marvel Comics universe
- Zephyr, a comic book character created by characters in the TV series Queer as Folk
- Zephyr, a playable character from Warframe
- Zephyr, in the video game City of Heroes
- Zephyr, in the video game Heroes of Newerth
- Zephyr, in the film The Hunchback of Notre Dame II, voiced by Haley Joel Osment
- Zephyr, in the TV series Killjoys
- Zephyr, in the TV series My Little Pony: Friendship is Magic
- Zephyr, in the video game Need for Speed Rivals
- Zephyr, in the manga series One Piece
- Zephyr, in the video game series Ratchet & Clank
- Zephyr, in the video game Resonance of Fate
- Zephyr, in the video game Tornado Outbreak
- Zephyr, in the video game XCOM: Chimera Squad
- Zephyr, in the short animated film How to Train Your Dragon: Homecoming

=== Fictional entities ===
- Zephyr, the Alabama town setting of the novel Boy's Life
- Zephyr, a prototype battery in the 2010 film Knight and Day
- The Hoboken Zephyrs, a baseball team in The Twilight Zone episode "The Mighty Casey"
- Zephyr, a sailboat in the children's book The Wreck of the Zephyr
- Zephyr, an obtainable bow in the video game The Elder Scrolls V: Skyrim
- Zephyr, a realm in the video game Spyro 2: Ripto's Rage!
- Zephyr, a ship within the fleet of the sci-fi series Battlestar Galactica

=== Music ===
==== Albums ====
- Zephyr (Zephyr album)
- Zephyr (Basement Jaxx album), a 2009 EP by Basement Jaxx

==== Performers ====
- Zephyr (band), an American blues-based hard rock band formed in 1968
- The Zephyrs, a Scottish indie band
- Zephyr Quartet, an Australian string quartet

==== Songs ====
- "Zephyr" (Madeon song), written and produced by Madeon, from the album Adventure
- "Zephyr", from the Mary Chapin Carpenter album The Age of Miracles
- "Zephyr", by one man project Conjure One (Rhys Fulber) from Exilarch
- "The Zephyr Song", from the Red Hot Chili Peppers' album By the Way
- "Zephyrus" (Bloc Party song), by Bloc Party, on their album Intimacy
- "Andvari" (English: zephyr), on the Sigur Rós album Takk...

=== Radio stations ===
- WRKN (FM), an alternative rock station (formerly known as 106.1 the Zephyr) in New Orleans, Louisiana, US
- KZFR, a community radio station in Chico, California, US
- WZPH-LP, 96.7 FM The Zephyr, a Classic Oldies station in Zephyrhills, Florida, US

=== Other media ===
- Zephyr (film), a 2010 Turkish feature film
- Zephyr (video game), a 1994 PC game
- Zephyr (sculpture), a 1998 stainless steel sculpture by Steve Wooldridge
- Zephyr Books, a publishing imprint of the Continental Book Company in the 1940s

== Businesses ==
- Zephyr Books, a publishing imprint of the Continental Book Company in the 1940s
- Zephyr Headwear, a headwear company
- Zephyr Technology, a medical technology company
- Jeff Ho Surfboards and Zephyr Productions, a surfboard manufacturing facility and surf shop

== People ==
- Zephyr (artist), graffiti artist from New York City
- Mikhail Mukasei (1907–2008, code name: Zephyr), Soviet spy active from the 1940s through the 1970s
- Zephyr Moore Ramsey (1893–1984), African American lawyer based in Southern California
- Zephyr Teachout (born 1971), professor at Fordham University and former candidate for governor of New York
- Zephyr Wright (née Zephyr Black; 1915–1988), African American civil rights activist and chef for President Lyndon Johnson
- Zooey Zephyr (born 1988), Montana state representative

== Places ==
=== United States ===
- Zephyr Cove, Nevada
- Zephyr, North Carolina
- Zephyr, Texas

=== Other places ===
- Zephyr, Ontario, Canada
- Zephyr Glacier, Antarctica

== Science and technology ==
=== Computing ===
- Zephyr (operating system), small FLOSS real-time operating system
- Zephyr (protocol), an instant messenger protocol and application-suite
- Zephyr, a hardware revision of Microsoft's Xbox 360 video game console
- Zephyr, a commercial test management tool sold by SmartBear Software

=== Other uses in science and technology ===
- Zephyr (rover), a NASA concept for a robotic Venus rover
- Zephyranthes, a plant genus whose species include the zephyr lily
- Washoe Zephyr, a meteorological phenomenon in the western US

== Transportation ==
=== Aviation ===
- Advanced Aviation Zephyr, ultralight, homebuilt aircraft
- Addyman Zephyr, a one-off, single seat sailplane
- Airbus Zephyr or Qinetiq Zephyr, a series of solar-powered UAVs
- ATEC Zephyr, Czech ultralight aircraft manufactured by ATEC
- Bartlett Zephyr, light, civil aircraft of the 1940s
- Fouga Zéphyr, a carrier-capable jet trainer for the French Navy, based on the Fouga Magister
- Qinetiq Zephyr, later Airbus Zephyr, a solar powered unmanned air vehicle
- RAE Zephyr, 1923 pusher biplane

=== Maritime ===
- Zephyr (ship), several mercantile vessels
- Zephyr (dinghy), a New Zealand sailing dinghy class
- HMS Zephyr, eight ships of the British Royal Navy
- RV Zephyr, a research vessel
- USS Zephyr (PC-8), US Navy ship
- Zephyr Seaport Liberty Cruise, a sightseeing service operated by Circle Line Downtown in New York, US

=== Rail ===
- California Zephyr, an American passenger train service
- Zephyr (train), a type of train-set with matching streamlined locomotive and passenger cars

=== Road ===
- Ford Zephyr, a 1950–1972 British executive car
- Kawasaki Zephyr, a 1989–2000 Japanese sport bike
- Lincoln-Zephyr, a 1936–1942 American mid-size luxury car
  - Lincoln-Zephyr V12 engine, a 1936–1948 series of engines
- Lincoln Zephyr, a 2022–present Chinese mid-size luxury sedan
- Lincoln MKZ, a 2006–2020 American mid-size luxury sedan, originally named the Lincoln Zephyr
- Mercury Zephyr, a 1978–1983 American compact car

== Sports ==
- Zephyr (garment), used in competitive rowing
- Chicago Zephyrs, former name of the NBA franchise currently known as the Washington Wizards
- Denver Zephyrs, former minor league baseball team
- Muskegon Zephyrs, former ice hockey team
- New Orleans Zephyrs, a former name of the Pacific Coast League franchise now known as the Wichita Wind Surge
- Rizing Zephyr Fukuoka, a Japanese professional basketball team
- Spokane Zephyr FC, a professional women's soccer team
- Zephyr skateboard team, also known as Z-Boys, in the 1970s

== Other uses ==
- Zephyrus or Zephyr, one of the Anemoi and the Greek god of the west wind
  - West wind or light wind, in European tradition
- Zephyr (cloth), a lightweight cotton fabric
- Zefir (food) or zephyr, a type of soft confectionery
- Zephyr, a cultural festival of Orissa Engineering College, India
- Zephyr, a wooden roller coaster at the former amusement park Pontchartrain Beach, New Orleans, Louisiana, US

== See also ==
- Zephyrhills, Florida, US
- Zephyr One, a fictional transport and mobile headquarters in the TV series Agents of S.H.I.E.L.D.
- Zephir (disambiguation)
- Zefir (disambiguation)
- Xephyr, a unix computer display server which targets a window on a host X Server as its framebuffer
- Sapphire (disambiguation)
