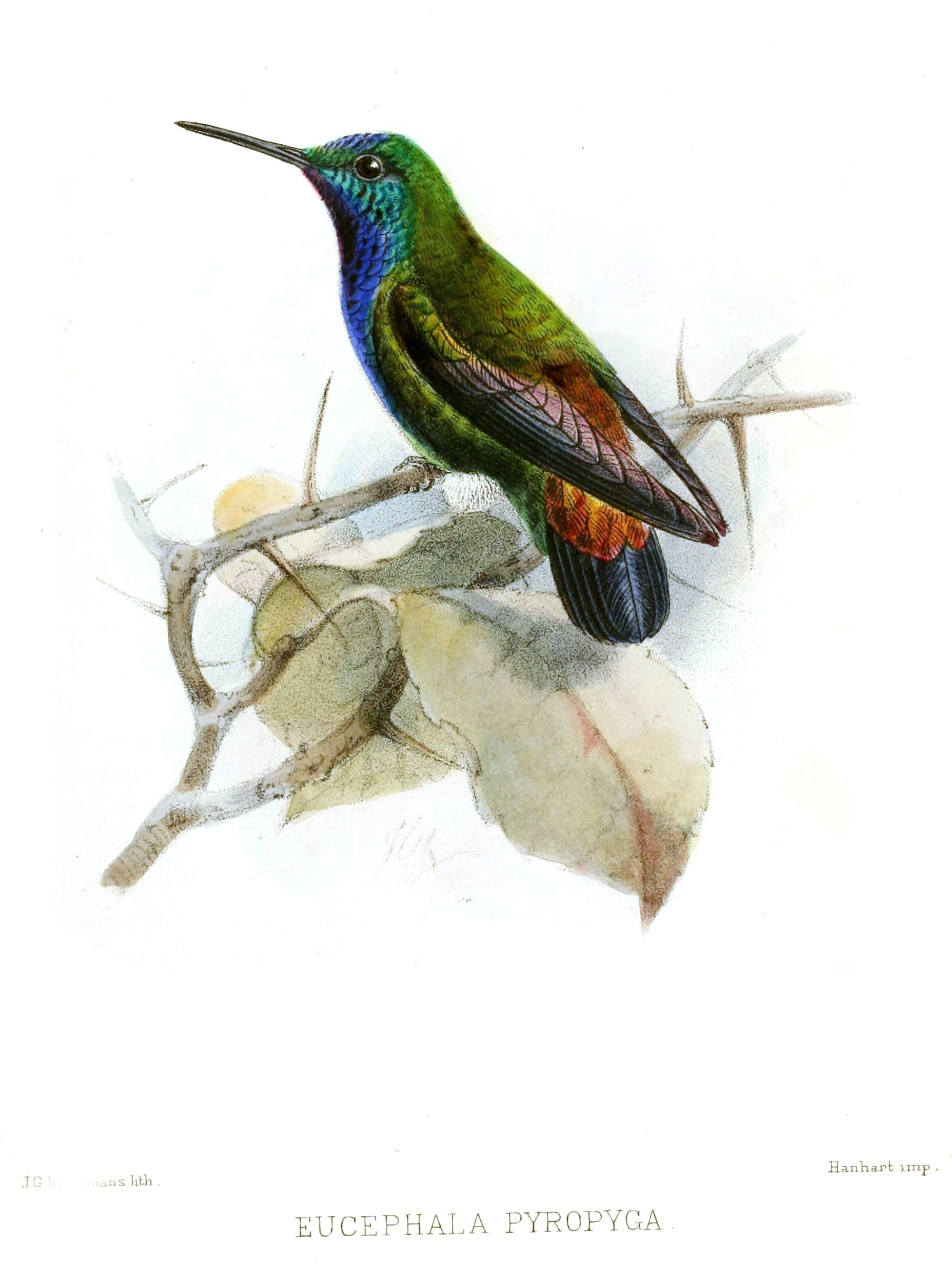

Scientific classification (disputed)
- Domain: Eukaryota
- Kingdom: Animalia
- Phylum: Chordata
- Class: Aves
- Clade: Strisores
- Order: Apodiformes
- Family: Trochilidae
- Genus: Hylocharis
- Species: H. pyropygia

Binomial name
- Hylocharis pyropygia Salvin & Godman, 1881

= Flame-rumped sapphire =

Species of bird

The flame-rumped sapphire (Hylocharis pyropygia) is a doubtfully valid species of hummingbird in the family Trochilidae known only from Brazil. Today few authorities accept it as valid, instead believing it represents a hybrid between Chlorostilbon lucidus and Hylocharis cyanus.
