= ATEC v.o.s. =

- Company type: Privately held company
- Industry: Aerospace
- Founded: 1992
- Headquarters: Libice nad Cidlinou, Czech Republic
- Products: Kit aircraft, light-sport aircraft, aircraft parts
- Owner: Petr Volejník
- Website: www.atecaircraft.eu/en

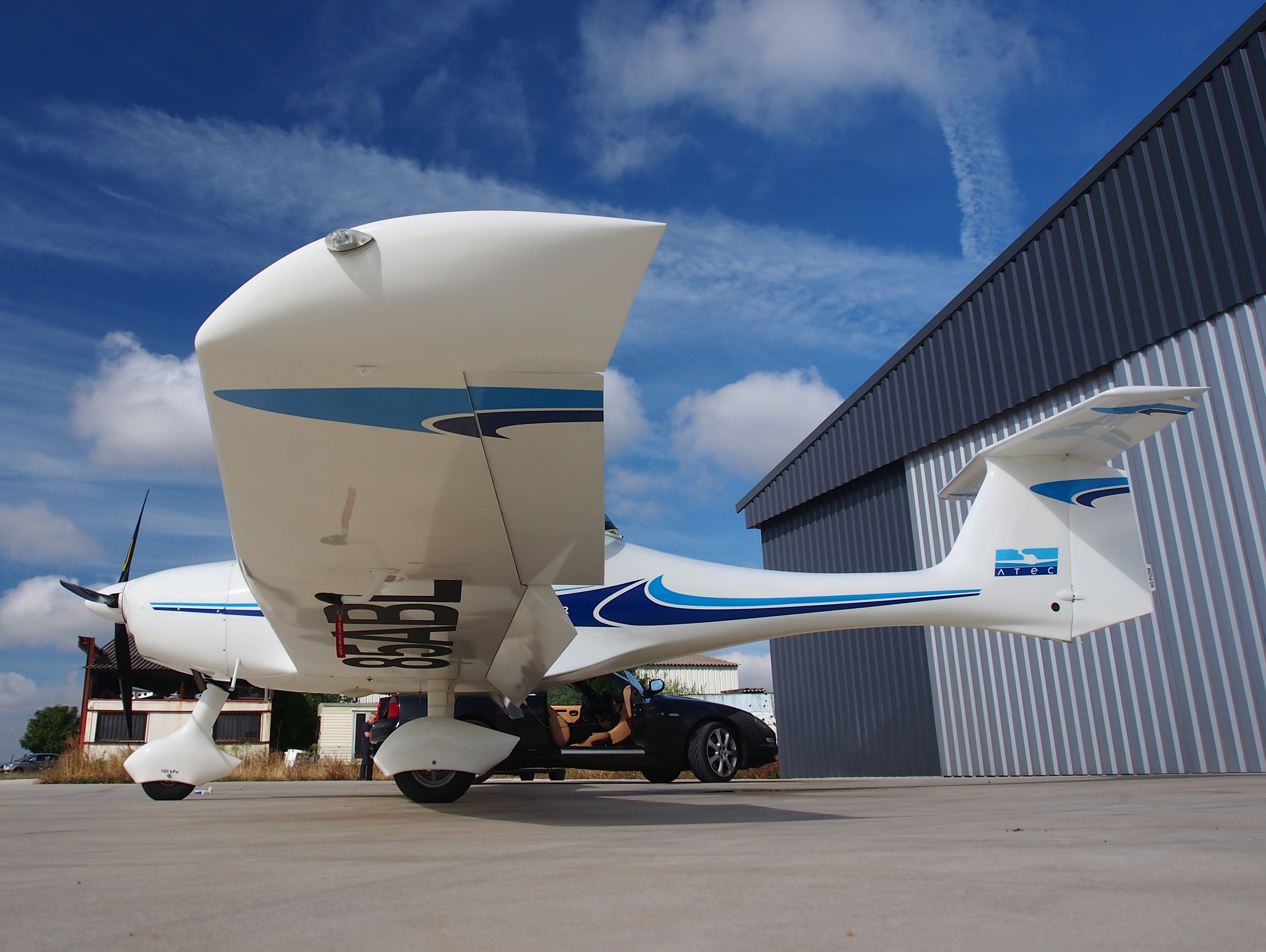
ATEC 122 Zephyr 2000

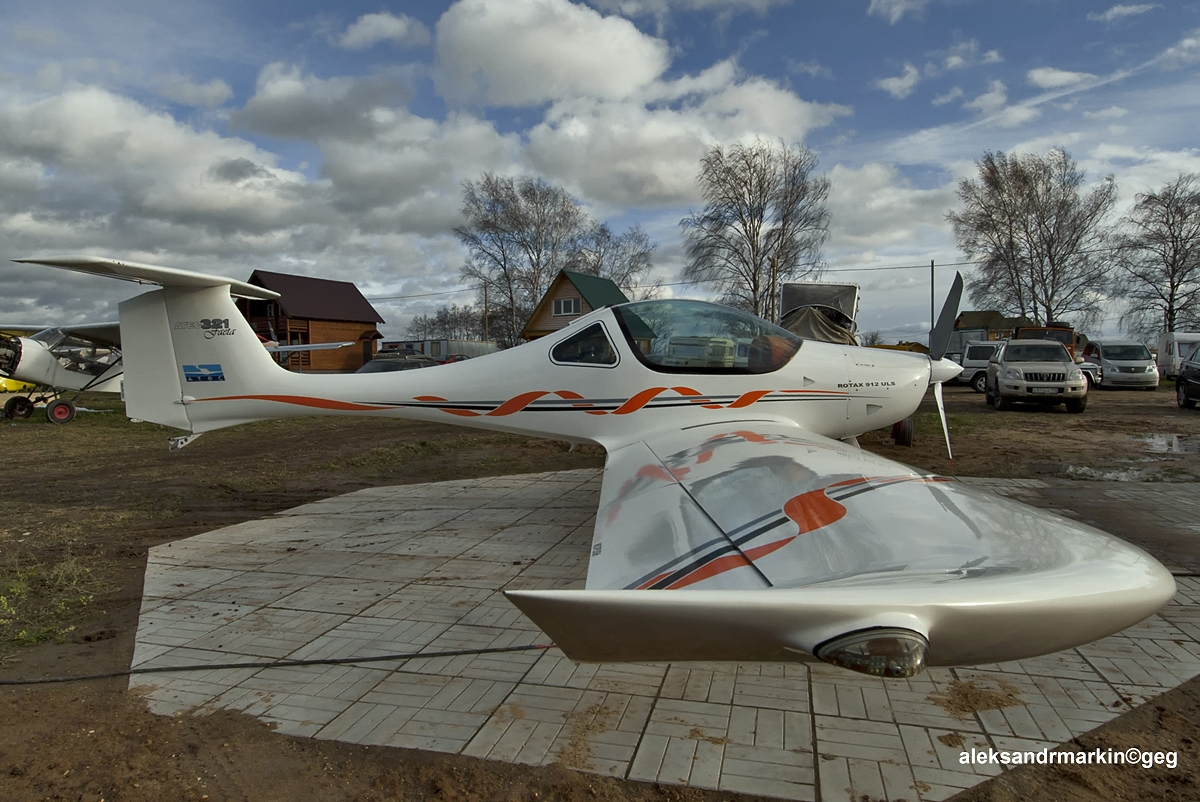
ATEC 321 Faeta

ATEC v.o.s. is a Czech aircraft manufacturer, founded in 1992 and based in Libice nad Cidlinou. The company specializes in the design and manufacture of ultralight aircraft in the form of kits for amateur construction as well as ready-to-fly aircraft for the European Fédération Aéronautique Internationale microlight and the American light-sport aircraft categories.

Petr Volejník is the company owner, general and production manager, designer and test pilot.

The company was formed in 1992 as a manufacturer of aircraft parts under sub-contract. The first aircraft built was the composite fuselage wood and fabric-wing Zephyr in 1996. The design was developed into the smaller, single-seat ATEC 212 Solo made entirely from carbon-fiber-reinforced polymer. The ATEC 321 Faeta was introduced in 2003 and improves on the Zephyr in that it is also made from carbon fibre.

The Faeta has been accepted by the US Federal Aviation Administration as a light-sport aircraft.

== Aircraft ==
Summary of aircraft built by ATEC
Model name	First flight	Number built	Type
ATEC 122 Zephyr 2000	1996	over 200	Two-seat, low-wing microlight aircraft
ATEC 212 Solo			Single-seat, low-wing microlight
ATEC 321 Faeta	2003		Two-seat, low-wing microlight
ATEC 321 Faeta NG	2016		Two-seat, low-wing microlight
