= HMS Pyramus (1810) =

Brig of the Royal Navy

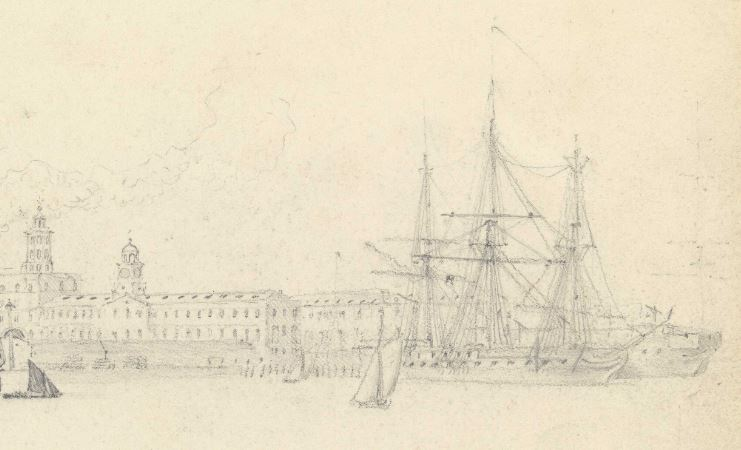
- HMS Pyramus at Portsmouth Dockyard on 6 September 1825, drawn by John Christian Schetky

History

United Kingdom
- Name: HMS Pyramus
- Ordered: Initially:29 June 1805; Re-order:May 1808
- Builder: Charles Greenword and Thomas Kidwell, Itchenor; Re-order:Portsmouth Dockyard
- Laid down: Initially:April 1806; Re-order:November 1808
- Launched: 22 January 1810
- Fate: Sold for breaking up in September 1879

General characteristics
- Tons burthen: 92020/94 (bm)
- Length: Gundeck: 141 ft 1 in (43.00 m); Keel: 117 ft 2 5/8 in (35.728 m)
- Beam: 38 ft 5 in (11.71 m)
- Depth of hold: 12 ft 0 in (3.66 m)
- Sail plan: Full-rigged ship
- Complement: 264
- Armament: Upper deck:26 × 18-pounder guns; QD:2 × 9-pounder gun + 10 × 32-pounder carronades; Fc:2 × 9-pounder gun + 2 × 32-pounder carronades

HMS Pyramus was a fifth-rate 36-gun frigate launched at Portsmouth in 1810. During the Napoleonic Wars she captured some small privateers. She was hulked in 1832–1833 at Halifax, Nova Scotia. The vessel was sold and broken up in 1879.

== Origin ==
Pyramus was the sole member of her class and was built on the lines of the French frigate Belle Poule, which the Royal Navy captured in 1780. She was ordered in 1805 and laid down the next year, but in 1807 the builder failed. The Admiralty transferred the frame to the Portsmouth Dockyard. The Admiralty reordered her and she was launched in 1810.

== Career ==
On 26 October 1813, Hotspur and Pyramus captured the 225 ton (bm) American letter of marque Chesapeake off Nantes. Captain Joseph Richardson had sailed her from America to France and she left Nantes on 18 October 1813. (Note: She had been commissioned at Baltimore on 7 July 1813. She had a crew of 33 and was armed with one 18-pounder gun and four 12-pounder carronades.)

On 29 November Pyramus captured the American vessel Zephyr, Jedediah Olcott, master, of four guns and 20 men. Zephyr had been sailing from Lorient to Charlestown.

Pyramus was laid up in 1829. Between November 1832 and July 1833 she underwent fitting for a convict and receiving ship for Halifax, Nova Scotia. From 1834 to 1875 she was at Halifax. She served as a hospital ship during the Chorea Epidemic.

== Fate ==
On 10 November 1879 she was sold for £1,600 for breaking up.
