= Stylidium graminifolium 'ST111' =

Cultivar of Stylidium graminifolium

- Species: Stylidium graminifolium
- Cultivar: 'ST111'
- Origin: Clarendon, New South Wales, Australia

Stylidium graminifolium 'ST111', also known under the tradename Tiny Trina, is a cultivar of Stylidium graminifolium that was selected for in 2001 by Todd Layt of Ozbreed Pty Ltd and granted cultivar status in 2005. Tiny Trina has a deeper pink flower colour and leaves that are a darker shade of green with varying leaf blade widths. It also begins to flower later in the season than the other S. graminifolium cultivar, Stylidium graminifolium 'ST116', known under the tradename Little Saphire.

== See also ==
- List of Stylidium species
