= John Brown (essayist) =

English Anglican priest, playwright and essayist

John Brown (5 November 1715 – 23 September 1766) was an English Anglican priest, playwright and essayist.

== Life ==
He was born in 1715 at Rothbury, Northumberland, the son of the Rev. John Brown (1677–1763), vicar of Wigton from that year, and his wife Eleanor Troutbeck, née Potts. He matriculated at St John's College, Cambridge in 1732, graduating B.A. 1736, and M.A. 1739; he became D.D. in 1755.

Graduating as senior wrangler, Brown took holy orders, and was appointed minor canon and lecturer at Carlisle. In the 1745 Jacobite Rebellion he took part in the defence of Carlisle as a volunteer, and in 1747 was appointed chaplain to Richard Osbaldiston, on his appointment to the bishopric of Carlisle.

In 1756 Brown was promoted by the Earl of Hardwicke to the living of Great Horkesley in Essex. In 1760 he was made vicar of St Nicholas Church, Newcastle upon Tyne.

Brown was consulted, through Daniel Dumaresq, about a scheme of education which Catherine II of Russia wanted to introduce into her dominions. A memorandum on the subject by Brown led to an offer on her part to entertain him at St Petersburg as her adviser on the subject. He had bought a postchaise and various other things for the journey, when he was persuaded to relinquish the design on account of his gout. He had been subject to fits of melancholy, and, influenced perhaps by disappointment, he committed suicide on 23 September 1766.

There is a detailed account of John Brown by Andrew Kippis in Biographia (1780), containing the text of the negotiations for his journey to Russia.

== Man of letters ==
The Oxford Dictionary of National Biography and The Machiavellian Moment agree that Brown was a writer influenced by Machiavelli, Bolingbroke, and Montesquieu. To these the ODNB adds John Locke; and Pocock Cato, i.e. Cato's Letters. He made his way as a man of letters as a younger member of the "Warburtonian circle": the followers of the cleric William Warburton.

=== Rise of an essayist ===
Brown published Honour (1743), a poem, through Robert Dodsley. It was followed by An Essay on Satire Occasion'd by the Death of Mr Pope (1745), which Brown at Carlisle published through Dodsley in London. This work gained for him the friendship of William Warburton. Warburton introduced him to Ralph Allen.

At Warburton's suggestion, Brown expanded the Essay on Satire, to an Essay (1751) on the Characteristicks of Anthony Ashley-Cooper, 3rd Earl of Shaftesbury. It is considered to have skewered Shaftesbury's deism and moral sense theory. The "test of ridicule" was supposed to be a key part of Shaftesbury's doctrine; Warburton wanted it undermined, and gave Brown the task. The Essay was dedicated to Allen, also a supporter of Anglican orthodoxy, and opponent of Shaftesbury. It contains a defence of a utilitarian philosophy, praised later by John Stuart Mill. The work was attacked, and Shaftesbury defended, in pamphlets by Charles Bulkley. Brown's theoretical argument, that ridicule was a type of valuation incompatible with a role as truth value, was taken up by William Preston.

=== Drama ===
Brown was interested in drama, but it earned him the disapproval of Warburton and Richard Hurd. He wrote Barbarossa (1754), a tragedy in five acts based on the story of Aruj Barbarossa and Zaphira, and Athelstane (1756), both performed; David Garrick and Mrs Cibber played in both, and the first was a success. Later, Brown's 1765 revision of Ben Jonson's Bartholomew Fair was rejected for production by Garrick.

=== "Estimate" Brown ===
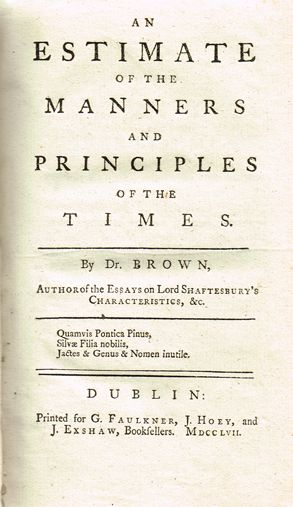
Estimate of the Manners and Principles of the Times title page, 1757

Brown's major popular success was the Estimate of the Manners and Principles of the Times (2 vols., 1757–1758), a bitter satire. It struck a chord after the Battle of Minorca (1756), a British reverse at the outset of the Seven Years' War. Edmund Burke, in a review for The Annual Register for 1758, rejected Brown's analysis as far as it depended on charges of "effeminacy" in the British nation and aesthetic. Thomas Sheridan believed the fundamental issue was selfishness, and the solution better oratory.

Robert Wallace replied with The Characteristics of the Present Political State of Great Britain (1758). In it he defended British culture and the current constitution. Brown's An Explanatory Defence of the Estimate (1758) claimed he had acted out to duty to country. Having earned the name "Estimate" Brown, he was prepared to notice Wallace, out of all his critics. When Charles Hanbury Williams gave Brown notice that he had written a reply to the first volume of the Estimate, a complex row dragging in Dodsley ensued, ending with Brown sending a curt message "Footman's language I never return."

A sequel on the politics of the Seven Years' War was Additional Dialogue of the Dead between Pericles and Cosmo (1760), in vindication of William Pitt the elder's policy.

=== Aesthetics ===
Brown knew Charles Avison, the Newcastle organist and composer, who published in 1752 An Essay on Musical Expression. The following year William Hayes defended Handel against Avison in a pamphlet, and stated that his Essay had been written for him by a "Junto". Brown had certainly contributed to it, with a number of others including William Mason. He went on to write A dissertation on the rise, union, and power, the progressions, separations and corruptions of poetry and music (1763). Avison's work prompted other such British aesthetic syntheses, from James Beattie, Thomas Twining and Daniel Webb; and the theme was picked up by German writers. Brown's work has been identified as belonging to conjectural history; he described in a 1761 letter to Garrick his stadial method of "deducing things from their state in savage life, through the several stages of civilized society."

The Cure of Saul: a Sacred Ode, a poem on the nature of music, was also from 1763, and was reprinted with the Dissertation. It was twice performed as an oratorio at Covent Garden Theatre that year, and once more in 1767. Handel had died, in 1759, and at Covent Garden the oratorio season was now run by John Christopher Smith and John Stanley.

The associated monograph of oratorio criticism, An Examination of the Oratorios which have been performed this Season, at Covent-Garden Theatre (1763) was published within weeks. It contained barely veiled criticism of Smith. Brown was defending his oratorio, and promoting a post-Handel reform agenda; The Critical Review had belittled him and his efforts, supporting as it did the Earl of Bute, the Prime Minister, while Brown backed William Pitt.

Brown is also associated with the rise of the picturesque, and appreciation of the landscape of the Lake District. He was a family friend of William Gilpin. He wrote on the subject to George Lyttelton, 1st Baron Lyttelton, around 1753. This letter has been identified as the first documentation of the "classicising" of the Lake District. It was published, in part, in 1766, in the London Chronicle; and then as a pamphlet.

== Bibliography ==
- Brown, John. An Examination of the Oratorios which have been performed this Season, at Covent-Garden Theatre (1763). Stanford, 2012. ISBN 1-479-19462-X
