= French submarine Saphir =

Four submarines of the French Navy have borne the name Saphir

- French submarine Saphir (1908), an Émeraude-class submarine launched in 1908
- French submarine Saphir (1928), the name ship of her class, launched in 1928
- French submarine Saphir (S616), an ex-British S-class submarine, HMS Satyr, transferred to French service in 1952
- French submarine Saphir (S602), a Rubis-class nuclear attack submarine launched in 1981
