= Flore Zéphir =

Flore Zéphir (January 11, 1958 – December 15, 2017) was a Haitian American academic and author.

== Biography ==
The daughter of Sylla Zéphir and France Garoute, she was born in Jérémie, Haiti. Zéphir came to the United States in 1975. She received a BA in French and Education from Hunter College in New York City and received two MAs and a PhD in French linguistics from Indiana University Bloomington. She has been teaching in the Romance Languages and Literatures department of the University of Missouri since 1988; she was department chair from fall 2008 to summer 2014. From August 2008 to December 2016, she was director of the Afro-Romance Institute at the University of Missouri. She received a number of awards, including a William T. Kemper Award for excellence in teaching, over her career. She conducted research into foreign language education, bilingual education, Creole studies, and ethnic and immigrant studies with particular emphasis on Haitians in the United States. She was a guest lecturer at the University of Florida-Gainesville, Vanderbilt University, Harvard University, the Massachusetts School of Professional Psychology and Northwestern University.

Zéphir contributed to various journals including The French Review, Foreign Language Annals, The Modern Language Journal, Journal of Pidgin and Creole Languages and Journal of Multilingual and Multicultural Development. From August 2003 to May 2013, she was book review editor for the Journal of Haitian Studies.

She published three books:

- Haitian Immigrants in Black America: A Sociological and Sociolinguistic Portrait (1996)
- Trends in Ethnic Identification Among Second-Generation Haitian immigrants in New York City (2001)
- The Haitian Americans (2004)

She died at the University of Missouri Hospital at the age of 59 following open heart surgery.
