= Safira =

Safira may refer to:

- As-Safira, a Syrian city
- Alisson Safira (born 1995), Brazilian footballer
- Safira Ika (born 2003), Indonesian soccer player
- Safira Rumimper (born 1997), Indonesian model, beauty pageant titleholder and a goodwill ambassador
- Zafire Hatun (c.1620s–1645/1646), slave in the Ottoman imperial harem and favourite of sultan Ibrahim
