= Zephyr Headwear =

Headwear company

- Company type: Private
- Industry: Sportswear
- Founded: 1993
- Founder: David Gormley
- Headquarters: Loveland, Colorado
- Products: Headwear, Apparel, Accessories
- Revenue: $55 million
- Website: zhats.com

Zephyr Headwear (also known as Z-Hats) is an American-based company that designs an produces headwear, apparel and accessories for sports fans, athletes and the general public. It was founded in 1993 in San Diego, California and currently employs 45 people. Zephyr produces hats for 250-300 colleges, professional sports organizations including National Hockey League and National Basketball Association teams, as well as artistic and stylized hats. The company is headquartered in Loveland, Colorado.

== History ==
Zephyr Headwear was founded in 1993 by David Gormley, a former sports retailer who previously operated four Pro Image franchises in Southern California. Frustrated by the lack of variety and innovation in the headwear market at the time, Gormley launched the company—initially known as Zephyr Graf-X—to focus specifically on the collegiate market. While major brands primarily focused on a handful of high-profile schools, Zephyr carved out a niche by producing high-quality, customized hats for hundreds of smaller and mid-sized universities, often featuring offbeat logos and unique color schemes that had previously been ignored by larger manufacturers.

By the early 2000s, Zephyr had grown into a powerhouse in the licensed apparel industry, at one point overtaking Nike as the top-selling collegiate headwear brand in rankings compiled by the Collegiate Licensing Company (CLC). The brand, often recognized by the "Z" logo on the side of its caps, expanded its reach beyond colleges to include partnerships with professional leagues like the NHL and NBA. In September 2020, Zephyr entered a strategic partnership with Lakeshirts/Blue 84, further solidifying its presence in the market. Most recently, in late 2025, the brand reached a major milestone by being named the official championship locker-room headwear provider for the NCAA, covering almost all championship celebration products across various sports.
