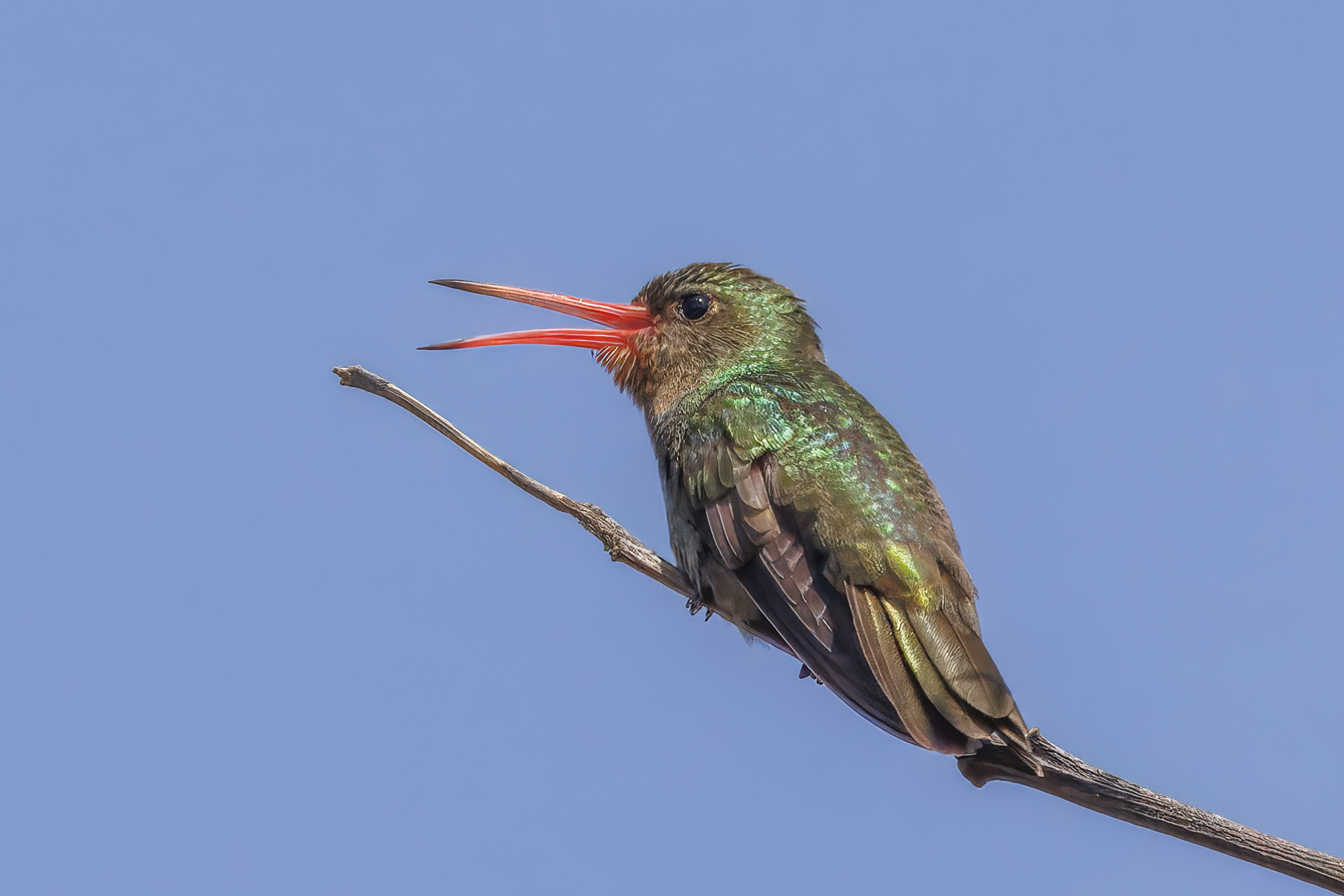
- In Argentina

Conservation status
- Least Concern (IUCN 3.1)
- CITES Appendix II

Scientific classification
- Kingdom: Animalia
- Phylum: Chordata
- Class: Aves
- Order: Apodiformes
- Family: Trochilidae
- Genus: Hylocharis
- Species: H. chrysura

Binomial name
- Hylocharis chrysura (Shaw, 1812)

Synonyms
- Hylocharis ruficollis; Amazilia chrysura

= Gilded sapphire =

Species of hummingbird

The gilded sapphire (Hylocharis chrysura), also known as the gilded hummingbird, is a species of hummingbird in the "emeralds", tribe Trochilini of subfamily Trochilinae. It is found Argentina, Bolivia, Brazil, Paraguay, and Uruguay.

== Taxonomy ==
The names of this species, both English and scientific, have not been settled. The International Ornithological Committee calls it the gilded sapphire (Hylocharis chrysura). The South American Classification Committee of the American Ornithological Society and the Clements taxonomy call it the gilded hummingbird, also with the binomial H. chrysura. BirdLife International's Handbook of the Birds of the World also calls it the gilded hummingbird but with the binomial Amazilia chrysura. The first three systems agree that it shares genus Hylocharis with the rufous-throated sapphire (H. sapphirina). All four agree that it is monotypic.

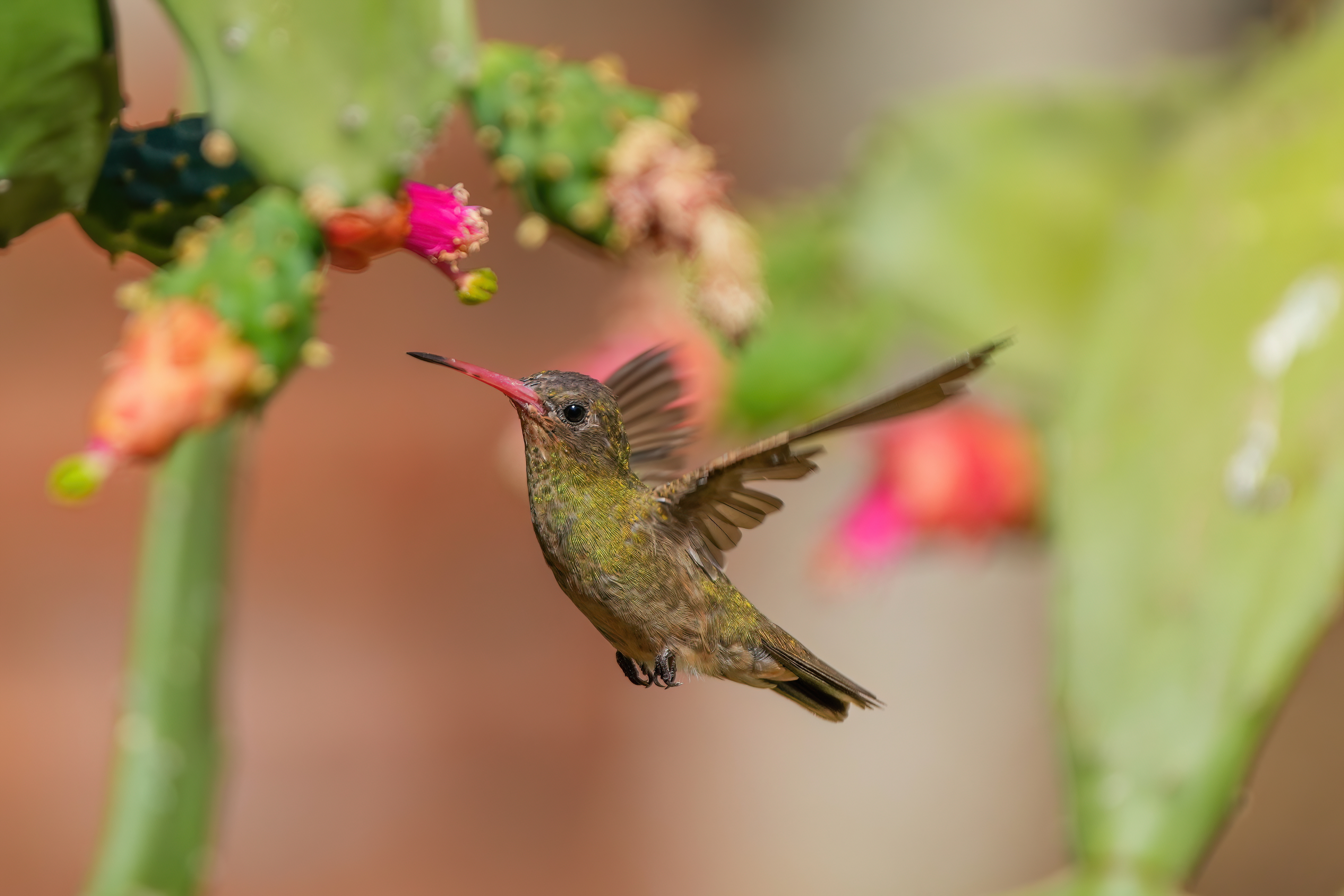
Encontro das Águas State Park, Brazil

== Description ==
The gilded sapphire is 8 to 10 cm (3.1 to 3.9 in) long and weighs 4 to 5 g (0.14 to 0.18 oz). Both sexes have a medium length, straight, coral red bill with a black tip. Adult males are mostly iridescent golden-green, with a pale rufous chin and a glittering golden-bronze tail. Adult females are almost the same, but duller overall and with a grayish lower belly. Juveniles are like the adult female with buff fringes on the feathers of the head.

== Distribution and habitat ==
The gilded sapphire is found in northeastern to south central Bolivia, essentially all of Paraguay and Uruguay, central and southeastern Brazil, and northern Argentina. It inhabits open landscapes such as savannah with scattered trees, the edges and clearings of forests, plantations, and gardens. It is most numerous at elevations between 400 and 800 m (1,300 and 2,600 ft). It is regularly found down to 200 m (660 ft) and up to 1,000 m (3,300 ft), and locally even higher.

== Behavior ==
=== Movement ===
The gilded sapphire appears to be generally sedentary, but it is migratory in parts of Brazil and adjacent Bolivia. Its movements elsewhere, if any, are poorly understood.

=== Feeding ===
The gilded sapphire forages for nectar at a wide variety of native and introduced plants, shrubs, and trees. It seeks nectar at all levels of its habitat. In addition to nectar the species feeds on insects caught by hawking from a perch and also gleans spiders from webs.

=== Breeding ===
The gilded sapphire's breeding season in Brazil spans from September to February but has not been defined elsewhere. It builds a cup nest of plant seed fibers and cobweb with lichen and bits of leaf on the outside. It typically places it somewhat exposed on a thin horizontal branch or in a fork about 4 to 6 m (10 to 20 ft) above the ground, but occasionally as high as 10 m (30 ft). The female incubates the clutch of two eggs for 14 to 15 days and fledging occurs 20 to 28 days after hatch.

=== Vocalization ===
The gilded sapphire's song is "a repeated high-pitched, cricket-like trill of variable length". Its call is "a short dry rattle 'trrrt'."

== Status ==
The IUCN has assessed the gilded sapphire as being of Least Concern. It has a very large range and though its population size is not known it is believed to be increasing. No immediate threats have been identified. It is considered very common throughout its range and it "readily accepts man-made habitats such as gardens and plantations [and] range expansion can be expected."
