= ATEC 321 Faeta =

321 Faeta
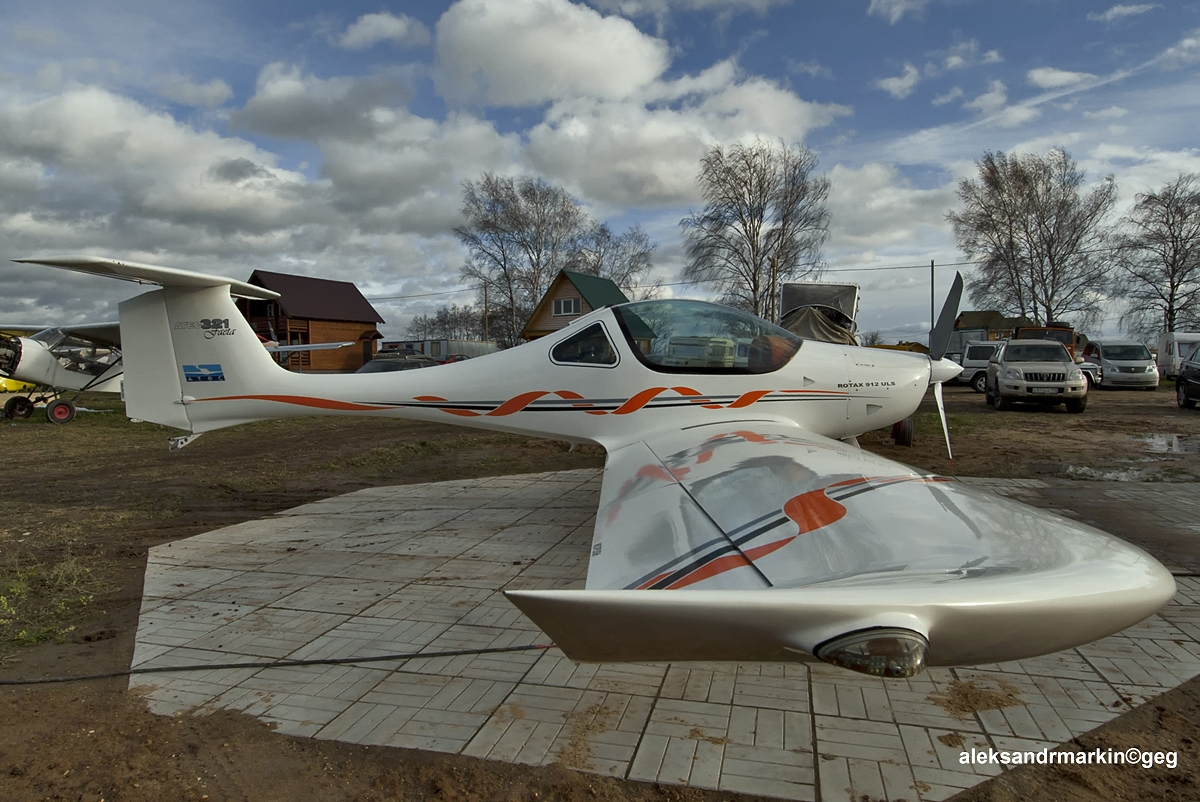

General information
- Type: Ultralight aircraft and Light-sport aircraft
- National origin: Czech Republic
- Manufacturer: ATEC v.o.s.
- Status: In production

History
- Introduction date: 2003
- Developed from: ATEC 122 Zephyr 2000

The ATEC 321 Faeta is a Czech ultralight and light-sport aircraft, designed and produced by ATEC v.o.s. of Libice nad Cidlinou. It was developed from the earlier ATEC 122 Zephyr 2000. The aircraft is supplied as a complete ready-to-fly-aircraft.

== Design and development ==
The Faeta was designed to comply with the Fédération Aéronautique Internationale microlight rules and US light-sport aircraft rules. It features a cantilever low-wing, a two-seats-in-side-by-side configuration enclosed cockpit under a bubble canopy, fixed tricycle landing gear, a T-tail and a single engine in tractor configuration. It is an approved SLSA in the USA.

The aircraft fuselage is made with a carbon fibre shell and composite sandwich bulkheads. The 9.6 m (31.5 ft) span wing is made from carbon fibre sandwiches built upon a laminated wooden spar. The wing varies from the Zephyr in that it has a different tapered planform and uses a new airfoil. The design attempts to provide a lower empty weight and stall speed than the 122 Zephyr. The standard engine available is the 100 hp (75 kW) Rotax 912ULS four-stroke powerplant.

The Nordic Omsider amphibian prototype uses the wings and part of the tail from the Faeta.

== Specifications (321 Faeta) ==
Data from Bayerl and Tacke

General characteristics

- Crew: one
- Capacity: one passenger
- Wingspan: 9.6 m (31 ft 6 in)
- Wing area: 10.1 m^{2} (109 sq ft)
- Empty weight: 278 kg (613 lb)
- Gross weight: 472.5 kg (1,042 lb)
- Fuel capacity: 70 litres (15 imp gal; 18 US gal)
- Powerplant: 1 × Rotax 912ULS four cylinder, liquid and air-cooled, four stroke, 75 kW (101 hp)
- Propellers: 3-bladed composite

Performance

- Maximum speed: 270 km/h (170 mph, 150 kn)
- Cruise speed: 227 km/h (141 mph, 123 kn)
- Stall speed: 52 km/h (32 mph, 28 kn)
- Rate of climb: 7 m/s (1,400 ft/min)
- Wing loading: 46.78 kg/m^{2} (9.58 lb/sq ft)
