= Safir (Belgian beer) =

Former Belgian pilsner brand

Safir is a former Belgian pilsner beer brand from brewery AB InBev.

The brand was introduced in 1939 by Brouwerij De Gheest in Aalst. The beer brand became the main product of that brewery, especially after the Second World War, when it became known informally as Safir Brewery. In 1979 Brewery De Gheest was taken over by Brewery Artois. In 1988 production of Safir moved to Leuven, with a promise that the brand would continue to exist. When Brewery Artois became part of Interbrew, the brand stayed in the portfolio of Interbrew and later its successors InBev, and AB InBev. The beer had a loyal following in Aalst and the surrounding area. However, it did not appear in the official brand list of AB InBev and it was finally discontinued in 2013. In November 2018, the beer brand was temporarily returned to the market until April 1, 2019.
