= Stylidium graminifolium 'ST116' =

Cultivar of carnivorous plant

- Species: Stylidium graminifolium
- Cultivar: 'ST116'
- Origin: Clarendon, New South Wales, Australia

Stylidium graminifolium 'ST116', also known under its tradename Little Saphire, is a cultivar of Stylidium graminifolium that was selected for in 2001 by Todd Layt of Ozbreed Pty Ltd and granted cultivar status in 2005. Little Saphire is of a shorter stature, has shorter but wider leaves, larger flowers, and a deeper blue-green foliage colour than the parent species. It also begins to flower earlier in the season than the other S. graminifolium cultivar, Stylidium graminifolium 'ST111', also known under its tradename Tiny Trina.

== See also ==
- List of Stylidium species
