= Zaphira =

Wife of Selim al-Toumi, the Emir of Algiers

- Died: 1516; Algiers
- Spouse: Selim al-Toumi
- Children: One son

Zaphira or Zafira (in Arabic: زفيرة) is said to have been the wife of Selim al-Toumi, the Emir of Algiers in the 16th century. In Western historiography, she is also referred to as "Princess Zaphira" or spelled incorrectly as Saphira.

Jacques Philippe Laugier de Tassy, the French Consulate Chancellor in Algiers from 1717 to 1718, was the first to report on Zaphira's life events in his History of the Kingdom of Algiers (1725). As the wife of Selim, who became the Emir of Algiers in 1510 to fight against Ferdinand the Catholic, Zaphira witnessed the corsair Aruj Barbarossa seize power in September 1516 after betraying her husband, and he was determined to marry her. Despite his advances, she refused him out of loyalty to the memory of her husband, who was killed by Aruj. After multiple rejections, he attempted to rape her, but she committed suicide.

The historicity of Zaphira has been doubted since the 18th century and has been more vigorously rejected since the 19th century, as Tassy often collected both true and false information or invented stories.

== According to Laugier de Tassy's biography ==
=== War against Spain ===
Zaphira is said to be from illustrious Arab families in Mitidja. In 1510, she was the wife of Selim al-Toumi and the mother of their twelve-year-old son. Selim was called upon by the people of Algiers to lead an offensive against the King of Spain, Ferdinand the Catholic. However, the Spanish navy defeated the population, leading them to call upon the Ottoman corsair Aruj Barbarossa.

=== Aruj's Plot ===
The people and Selim welcomed Aruj and his men with great joy. In a position of power, the corsair secretly planned to conquer the territory of Algiers. As Aruj's men mistreated the people and their commander never took their opinions into account, Selim understood the corsair's intentions and decided to kill him as quickly as possible.

Aruj was also attracted to Zaphira's beauty. By marrying Selim's widow, her noble birth would allow him to be respected, as he was born poor. Aruj and his brother Khaïr-Eddine had Selim strangled in his bath in 1516 during the capture of Algiers. Fearing for his life, Selim and Zaphira's son fled to Oran, which was then controlled by the Spaniards.

=== Confinement in Algiers ===
Zaphira initially submitted to Aruj. She desired revenge against the usurper but was dissuaded from assassinating the new regent of Algiers by her servants. Aruj, still determined to marry her, treated her with great honor. Zaphira suffered greatly in her situation, so the regent sent her a compassionate letter and advised her to marry him, promising her all the advantages that would come with being a widow.

Zaphira responded that she could not accept Aruj's proposal out of loyalty to Selim and horror at the monarch's and his men's crimes. She asked him to allow her to return to her native Mitidja. Aruj replied that he was not responsible for Selim's murder and decided to wait before renewing his proposal.

=== Suicide ===
In order to exonerate himself in Zaphira's eyes, Aruj paid false witnesses to name fake assassins of Selim, who confessed under torture before being strangled. The regent sent a letter to Zaphira, recounting how he had the true murderers of her husband assassinated. But Zaphira responded that she would rather commit suicide in the face of his tyranny if he did not allow her to leave Algiers.

Aruj visited Zaphira, who stood up to him. Irritated, Aruj gave her one more day before marrying her. The next day, Aruj returned determined to marry her. When she refused him again, he attempted to rape her. Having hidden a dagger under her robe, Zaphira tried to kill him but only managed to wound his arm. Aruj called someone to disarm her, but Zaphira poisoned herself with a vial she had also concealed in her robe. The regent had Zaphira's loyal servants strangled and buried with their mistress.

== Historicity ==
Jacques Philippe Laugier de Tassy, the French Consulate Chancellor in Algiers from 1717 to 1718, was the first to report on Zaphira's life events in his History of the Kingdom of Algiers, published in 1725. In the preface, he stated that he translated a vellum manuscript held by Sidi Ahmed ben Haraam, a marabout from Constantine claiming descent from Selim al-Toumi, and that few people know the story of Zaphira. The anecdote is mentioned in several biographies and dictionary articles about the Barbarossa brothers in the 18th and 19th centuries.

Since the 18th century, the historicity of Zaphira and the events surrounding her have been debated and generally rejected. Joseph Morgan, in the first volume of A Complete History of Algiers (1731), conducted research to verify if it was based on pre-existing tradition but claimed to have stayed in the country for too long to have never heard of Zaphira. In 1855, A. Le Clerq considered it possible that Tassy was not the inventor of this historical fraud because the historian acknowledged its implausibility. However, Le Clerq noted that the epistolary exchange between Zaphira and Aruj Barbarossa was written in the style of 18th-century French taste and had "absolutely nothing Arabic" about it, deeming it highly unlikely that Zaphira knew how to read and write. In 1888, Maurice Le Clercq indicated that Tassy was not always reliable in his reports and also judged the epistolary exchange as "completely ridiculous and implausible."

Historical critics in the 20th and 21st centuries have generally recognized Zaphira as a fictional character.

== In popular culture ==
=== Literature ===
In 1754, the tragedy Barbarossa by John Brown is based on the story of Aruj Barbarossa and Zaphira. However, in this version, Zaphira defeats Barbarossa, and her legitimate heir succeeds Selim.

In 2007, Abdelaziz Ferrah published a fictionalized version her life, Zaphira, ou la bataille pour Alger, 1516.

=== Film ===
In 2023, the film "La Dernière Reine" (The Last Queen), an Algerian film directed by Damien Ounouri and Adila Bendimerad, depicts Zaphira's resistance against Aruj. The co-director plays the title role, and Dali Benssalah portrays Aruj Barbarossa.

== Sources ==
- Tassy, Jacques Philippe Laugier de (1725). Histoire du royaume d'Alger, un diplomate français à Alger en 1724. Paris: Loysel. pp. 9–28.
