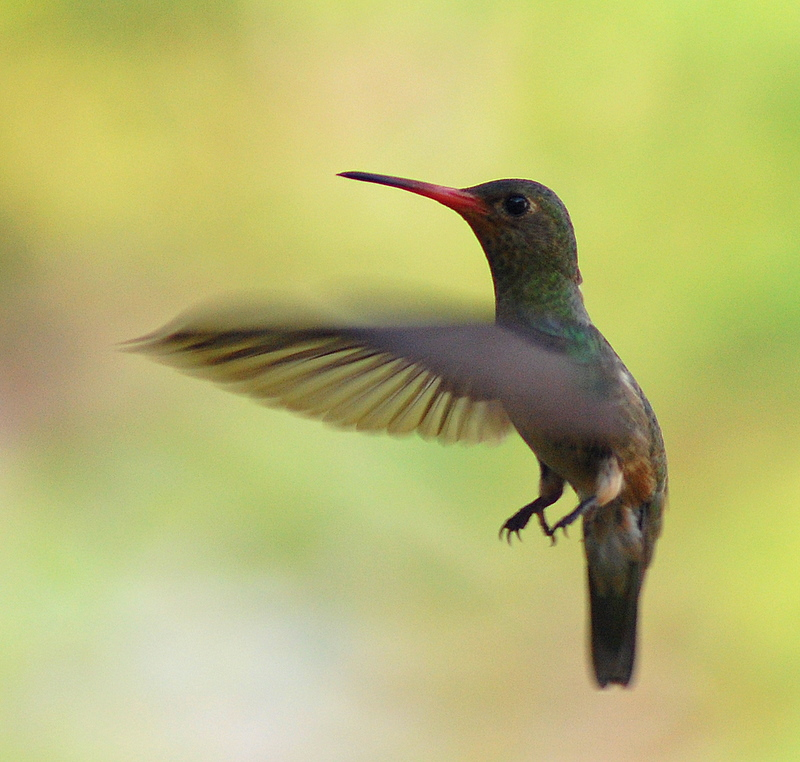
- female/immature male

Conservation status
- Least Concern (IUCN 3.1)
- CITES Appendix II

Scientific classification
- Kingdom: Animalia
- Phylum: Chordata
- Class: Aves
- Order: Apodiformes
- Family: Trochilidae
- Genus: Hylocharis
- Species: H. sapphirina

Binomial name
- Hylocharis sapphirina (Gmelin, JF, 1788)

Synonyms
- Rufous-throated hummingbird Amazilia sapphirina

= Rufous-throated sapphire =

Species of hummingbird

The rufous-throated sapphire (Hylocharis sapphirina) is a species of hummingbird in the "emeralds", tribe Trochilini of subfamily Trochilinae. It is found in Bolivia, Brazil, Colombia, Ecuador, the Guianas, Peru, Venezuela and possibly Argentina and Paraguay.

== Taxonomy and systematics ==
The rufous-throated sapphire was formally described in 1788 by the German naturalist Johann Friedrich Gmelin in his revised and expanded edition of Carl Linnaeus's Systema Naturae. He placed it with all the other hummingbirds in the genus Trochilus and coined the binomial name Trochilus sapphirinus. He gave the type locality as Guiana. Gmelin based his description on "Le saphir" that had been described in 1779 by the French polymath Georges-Louis Leclerc, Comte de Buffon and the "Sapphir humming-bird" that had been described in 1781 by the English ornithologist John Latham. The rufous-throated sapphire is now placed by most taxonomic systems with the gilded sapphire in genus Hylocharis that was introduced in 1831 by the German naturalist Friedrich Boie. However, BirdLife International's Handbook of the Birds of the World places it in genus Amazilia with the English name rufous-throated hummingbird.

The genus name Hylocharis combines the Ancient Greek hulē meaning "woodland" or "forest" with kharis meaning "beauty". The specific epithet is from Latin sapphirinus meaning "sapphirine" or "of sapphire".

The rufous-throated sapphire shares its genus with the gilded sapphire (H. chrysura) and is monotypic: no subspecies are recognized.

== Description ==
The rufous-throated sapphire is 8.4 to 9.1 cm (3.3 to 3.6 in) long. Males weigh 4.1 to 4.5 g (0.14 to 0.16 oz) and females 3.9 to 4.3 g (0.14 to 0.15 oz). Males have a medium length, straight, coral red bill with a black tip; females' bills have less red. The species gets its English name from the males' intensely rufous chin; females' chins are a paler rufous. Adult males have dark green upperparts with coppery violet uppertail coverts. Their throat, chest, and belly are iridescent violet-blue and their undertail coverts chestnut. Their central pair of tail feathers are coppery with a violet tinge and the other four pairs chestnut with dusky gray tips. Adult females' upperparts are the same as males'. Their underparts are grayish with large glittering blue-green spots on the throat and chest and buffy undertail coverts. Their tail is like the male's with paler edges on the outer feathers. Juveniles are similar to adult females but males have richer rufous on the chin.

== Distribution and habitat ==
The rufous-throated sapphire has three separate ranges. The largest spans from eastern Colombia east through Venezuela, the Guianas, and northern Brazil to the coast, from Colombia southwest through eastern Ecuador into northern Peru, and southwest in a wide swath from northeastern Brazil into northeastern Bolivia. Another spans from southeastern Brazil's Bahia state south to northern Paraná. The third encompasses southeastern Paraguay, northeastern Argentina, and adjacent southwestern Brazil according to the International Ornithological Committee and the Clements taxonomy. The South American Classification Committee of the American Ornithological Society lists the species as hypothetical in Paraguay and Argentina because the records have not been documented by photographs or other tangible evidence.

The rufous-throated sapphire inhabits semi-open to open landscapes such as the edges of lowland forest, savanna with scattered stands of trees, clearings around rock outcrops, coffee plantations, and (rarely) open coastal vegetation. In elevation it is most numerous between 200 and 500 m (660 and 1,600 ft) but occurs as high as 1,850 m (6,100 ft).

== Behavior ==
=== Movement ===
The rufous-throated sapphire's migration pattern is only partially understood. It is generally sedentary but is migratory in southeastern Brazil. It is suspected of making seasonal movements in Venezuela because it is unpredictably present.

=== Feeding ===
The rufous-throated sapphire forages for nectar at a variety of flowering epiphytes, shrubs, vines, and trees. Species in least seven families are known nectar sources. It usually feeds from near the ground to the middle strata of forest, but in Amazonia will gather with other hummingbirds at flowering treetops. Males aggressively defend feeding territories. In addition to nectar the species feeds on insects caught by hawking from a perch and also gleaned from leaves or spiderwebs.

=== Breeding ===
The rufous-throated sapphire's breeding season spans from July to January in the Guianas and from August to February in Brazil. It has not been defined in other parts of its range. It builds a cup nest of plant fiber lined with soft seed down, often with lichen and bits of leaves on the outside. It typically places it in a horizontal branch under overhanging leaves between 3 and 6 m (10 and 20 ft) above the ground but sometimes as high as 10 m (30 ft). The female incubates the clutch of two eggs for 14 to 16 days and fledging occurs 22 to 27 days after hatch.

=== Vocalization ===
The Venezuelan and Brazilian populations of rufous-throated sapphire have different songs. The former is "a series of 4–7 bright, high-pitched notes...repeated every few seconds, 'sping...sping...sping ...' or more bisyllabic 'sping...spewee...spewee...spewee'." In Amzonian and southeastern Brazil it is "an irregularly repeated, drawn-out, high-pitched downslurred 'seeeeeee'." The species' calls are "a repeated short dry trill and high-pitched 'seep'."

== Status ==
The IUCN has assessed the rufous-throated sapphire as being of least concern, though its population size and trend are not known. No immediate threats have been identified. It is considered common in most of its range and "[a]ccepts man-made habitats like coffee plantations, if bordered by natural, semi-open habitats."
