= Zephyr (1810 ship) =

UK whaler (1814–1840)

History

United States of America
- Name: Zephyr
- Launched: 1810, or 1811, United States
- Captured: 29 November 1813

United Kingdom
- Name: Zephyr
- Acquired: 1814 by purchase of a prize
- Fate: Wrecked 1 April 1840

General characteristics
- Tons burthen: 280, or 287, or 289, or 290 (bm)
- Armament: 12 × 12-pounder carronades

Zephyr was a vessel built in the United States that the Royal Navy captured in late 1813. Between 1814 and 1840, when she was lost, she made eight voyages as a whaler in the southern whale fishery.

== Career ==
Zephyr was the American vessel Zephyr, Jedediah Olcott, master, that HMS Pyramus had captured on 29 November 1813. Zephyr was auctioned on 2 March 1814. (Note: Zephyr, Jedediah Olcott, master, of 22 men and six guns, had received a letter of marque on 26 November 1812, but had returned it.)

Zephyr first appeared in the Register of Shipping in the volume for 1814, and probably because of missing pages in the volume for 1814, in Lloyd's Register in the volume for 1815.

Year	Master	Owner	Trade	Source
1814	W.Perry	Bridges	London–Southern Fishery	RS
1815	Perry	Bridges	London–South Seas	LR

In 1813, the British East India Company had lost its monopoly on the trade between India and Britain. British ships were then free to sail to India or the Indian Ocean under a licence from the EIC. Zephyr's owners applied on 16 September 1815, for a licence for Zephyr as a whaler, a licence they received on 19 September.

1st whaling voyage (1814–1815): Zephyr, Perry, master, sailed from Deal on 18 April 1814, bound for the South Seas. She sailed from Portsmouth on 20 April. She returned to London on 13 August 1815, from the coast of Peru.

2nd whaling voyage (1815–1818): Captain Morris sailed from London on 6 October 1815, bound for the waters off the West Coast of South America. Zephyr was reported to have been off the Galapagos Islands on 22 April 1816. On 31 March 1817, she was off the coast of Peru when Captain Morris and three crew members drowned while going from the shore to the ship. Zephyr, King, master, returned to London on 27 June 1818.

3rd whaling voyage (1818–1821): Captain P. Stavers (or Sturges) sailed from London on 8 September 1818, bound for the Galapagos Islands. On 18 April 1820, Zephyr was at Valparaiso. She returned to Gravesend on 8 February 1821.

4th whaling voyage (1821–1823): Captain P. Stavers sailed from London on 15 May 1821. He left in company with Tuscan and Earl Morley. On 30 May, Zephyr was at Madeira. She was later reported at Tahiti, the Northwest Coast, and Timor. She returned to London on 3 October 1823, with 1200 barrels of sperm oil.

Between her third and fourth whaling voyages Zephyr, changed hands several times and traded with South America. She may have been damaged in 1825.

Year	Master	Owner	Trade	Source & notes
1826	P.Stavers; J.Wilson	Osborn & Co.	London–South America	LR; repair 1825
1826	Wilson; Kell	Buson & Co. T.Ward	London–South America	Register of Shipping; thorough repair 1825

5th whaling voyage (1826–1829): Captain Kell sailed from London on 17 August 1826, bound for the Sandwich Islands. At Honolulu in May 1828, the crew became mutinous, refusing to take whales. Zephyr returned to London on 16 August 1829.

6th whaling voyage (1826–1829): Captain Billinghurst (or Balinest, or Billinghouse), sailed from London on 22 October 1829, bound for Timor and the Japans. On 26 March 1830, Zephyr was at Coepang. In October she was at Guam. On 14 June 1831, she was on the Japan grounds. At some point Zephyr was in company with Ranger, also a whaler, at Hunter's Island in the Solomon Archipelago. Dr. John Lyell, of Ranger, kept a journal in which he recorded that the local inhabitants attempted to capture Zephyr whilst most of her crew were onshore. In the attack, the captain, cooper, carpenter, and two boatsteerers were attacked and wounded, but not killed. The crew managed to release two large dogs from below and succeeded in forcing the natives off the vessel, killing some. The crew then pursued their attackers to shore and killed around thirty of them and a woman. Zephyr returned to England on 8 August 1832.

7th whaling voyage (1833–1837): Captain Thommpson sailed from England on 1 November 1833, bound for the Seychelles and Timor. At various points she was near Aldebra, at Mahe, and Sutranha, and at Timor. She stopped at the Cape of Good Hope on her way home. She arrived back in England on 13 April 1837.

8th whaling voyage (1837–loss): Captain Abbott sailed from England on 3 July 1837, bound for Timor. In mid-September 1838, Zephyr put into Amboyna with her crew in a state of mutiny. Captain Abbott had been killed a month before, and the crew refused to obey the Chief Officer. The Chief Officer left Zephyr and sailed on a Dutch vessel to Batavia. Zephyr followed. On 14 January 1839, Zephyr, Richardson, master, arrived at Sydney. At some point thereafter, she was at Hummock Island. On 1 April 1840, Zephyr, Kitchen, master, was wrecked off Borneo.

Loss: Her crew abandoned Zephyr on 3 April, and set fire to her. They reached Macassa Island from where a ship took them to Batavia.
