= USS Zephyr =

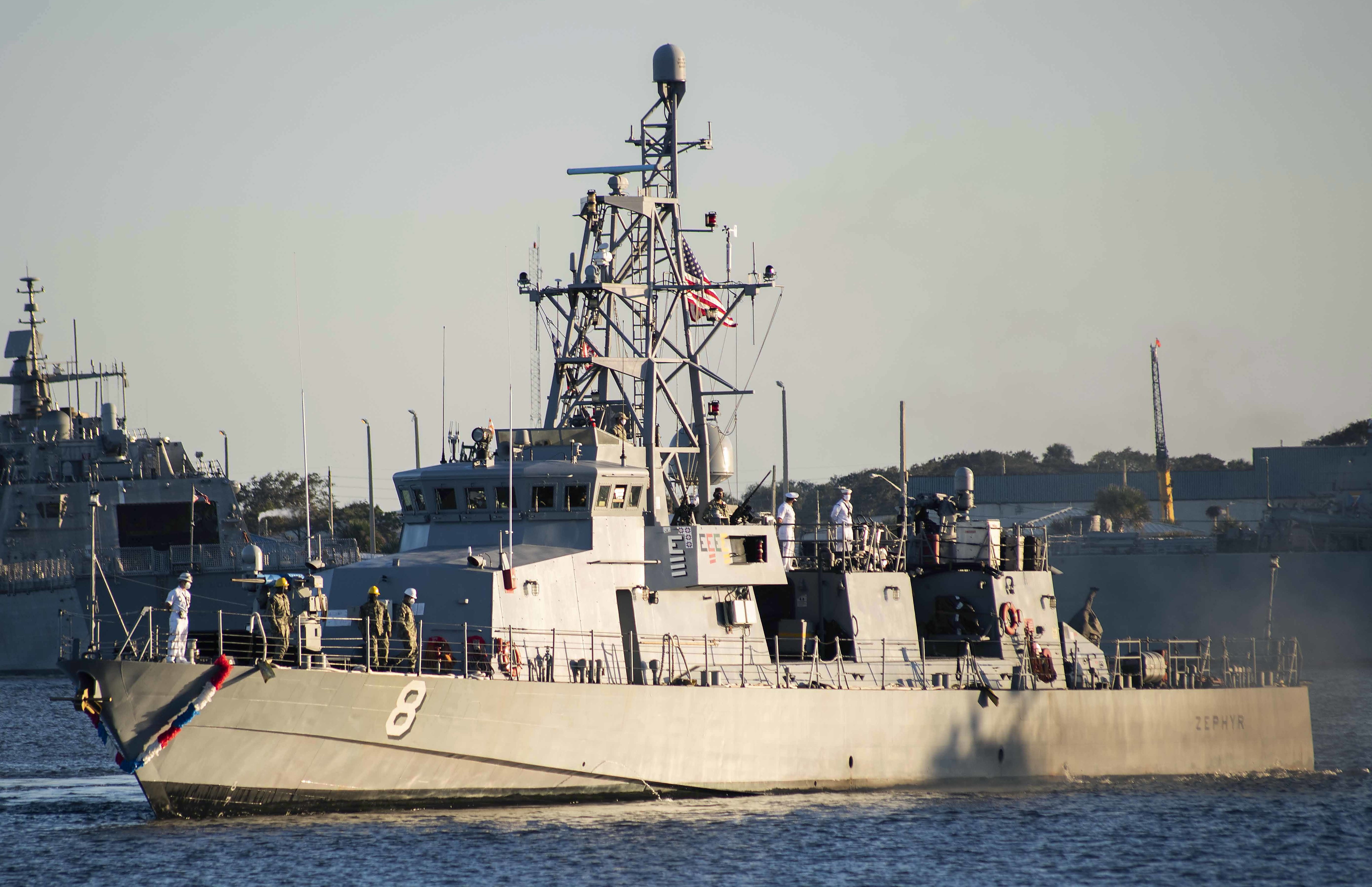
- USS Zephyr (PC-8) at Naval Station Mayport in 2020

History

United States
- Name: Zephyr
- Namesake: Zephyr
- Ordered: 3 August 1990
- Builder: Bollinger Shipyards, Lockport, Louisiana
- Laid down: 6 March 1993
- Launched: 3 December 1993
- Acquired: 16 August 1994
- Commissioned: 15 October 1994
- Decommissioned: 1 October 2004
- Recommissioned: 30 September 2011
- Decommissioned: 17 February 2021
- Stricken: 27 February 2021
- Identification: Callsign: NZPR
- Motto: Leading The Charge
- Nickname(s): The Eight Ballers (USN), Rear Pier (USCG)
- Fate: Scuttled as an artificial reef on March 23rd, 2026
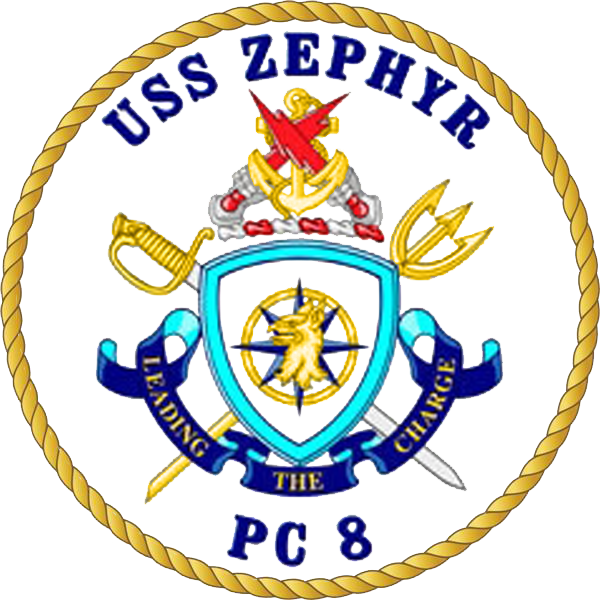
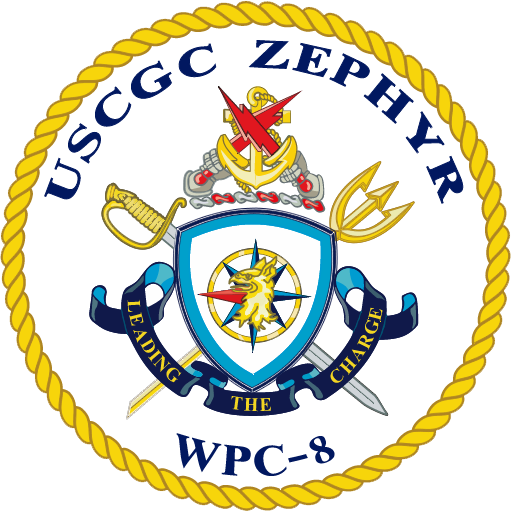
- Badge

General characteristics
- Class & type: Cyclone-class patrol ship
- Displacement: 331 tons
- Length: 179 ft (55 m)
- Beam: 25 ft (7.6 m)
- Draught: 7.5 ft (2.3 m)
- Speed: 35 knots (65 km/h; 40 mph)
- Range: 2,000 nmi (3,700 km; 2,300 mi) at 12 knots (22 km/h; 14 mph)
- Complement: 4 officers, 28 men
- Armament: 2 x Mk38 mod 3 guns with 7.62 mm co-axial guns; 2 x Mk19 grenade launchers; 2 x .50 (12.7 mm) machine guns

USS Zephyr (PC-8) was a Cyclone-class patrol coastal ship of the United States Navy.

Zephyr was the eighth ship of thirteen in the Cyclone class. All ships in this class were named after weather elements. Zephyr was the first Navy vessel to bear the name. She was laid down 6 March 1993, by Bollinger Shipyards, Lockport, Louisiana and launched 3 December 1993. She was commissioned on 14 October 1994 and decommissioned 1 October 2004 and transferred to the United States Coast Guard as USCGC Zephyr (WPC-8).

Zephyr was the first Coast Guard cutter deployed to respond to the Deepwater Horizon oil rig fire.

Zephyr was transferred back to the Navy on 30 September 2011, and was once again designated PC-8.

Zephyr was decommissioned on 17 February 2021.

On March 23rd, 2026, the USS Zephyr was scuttled off the coast of Okaloosa County, Florida as part of the Florida Fish and Wildlife Conservation Commission's Artificial Reef Program. It was listed as a 331-ton 178' steel vessel. It lies in 157 feet of water.
