= HMS Zephyr =

Nine ships of the Royal Navy have been named HMS Zephyr after Zephyrus, the Greek god of the west wind:

- HMS Zephyr, originally the sloop HMS Merlin, was captured by a French privateer in 1757. The British recaptured her in 1757 and the Royal Navy took her into service as Zephyr. The French frigate Gracieuse recaptured her in August 1778; she was disarmed and sold at Toulon in January 1780 for Lt44,200. The purchasers turned her into a privateer, which the British privateer Fame captured and burnt on 26 August 1780.
- HMS Zephyr (1779), launched in 1779, was a 14-gun sloop. She was renamed Navy Transport in 1782, and then Dispatch in 1783 before being sold in 1798.
- HMS Zephyr (1795), launched in 1795, was a 10-gun fireship. She was sold in 1808.
- HMS Zephyr (1809), launched in 1809, was a 16-gun brig-sloop. She was sold in 1818 for breaking up.
- HMS Zephyr (1823), launched in 1823, was a Cherokee-class 6-gun packet-brig. She immediately became a Falmouth packet. She was sold in 1836.
- HMS Zephyr (1837), transferred into service in 1837, was a 3-gun wooden paddle picket. She was sold in 1865 for breaking up.
- HMS Zephyr (1873), launched in 1873, was a 4-gun composite screw gunboat. She was sold in 1889 to become a salvage vessel. She was broken up in 1929.
- HMS Zephyr (1895), launched in 1895, was a Fervent-class destroyer. She was sold in 1920.
- HMS Zephyr (R19), launched in 1943, was a Z-class destroyer. She was broken up in 1958.

== Battle honours ==
- Quebec 1759
- Martinique 1762
- Copenhagen 1801
- Baltic 1854
- Arctic 1945
