= ATEC 122 Zephyr 2000 =

122 Zephyr 2000
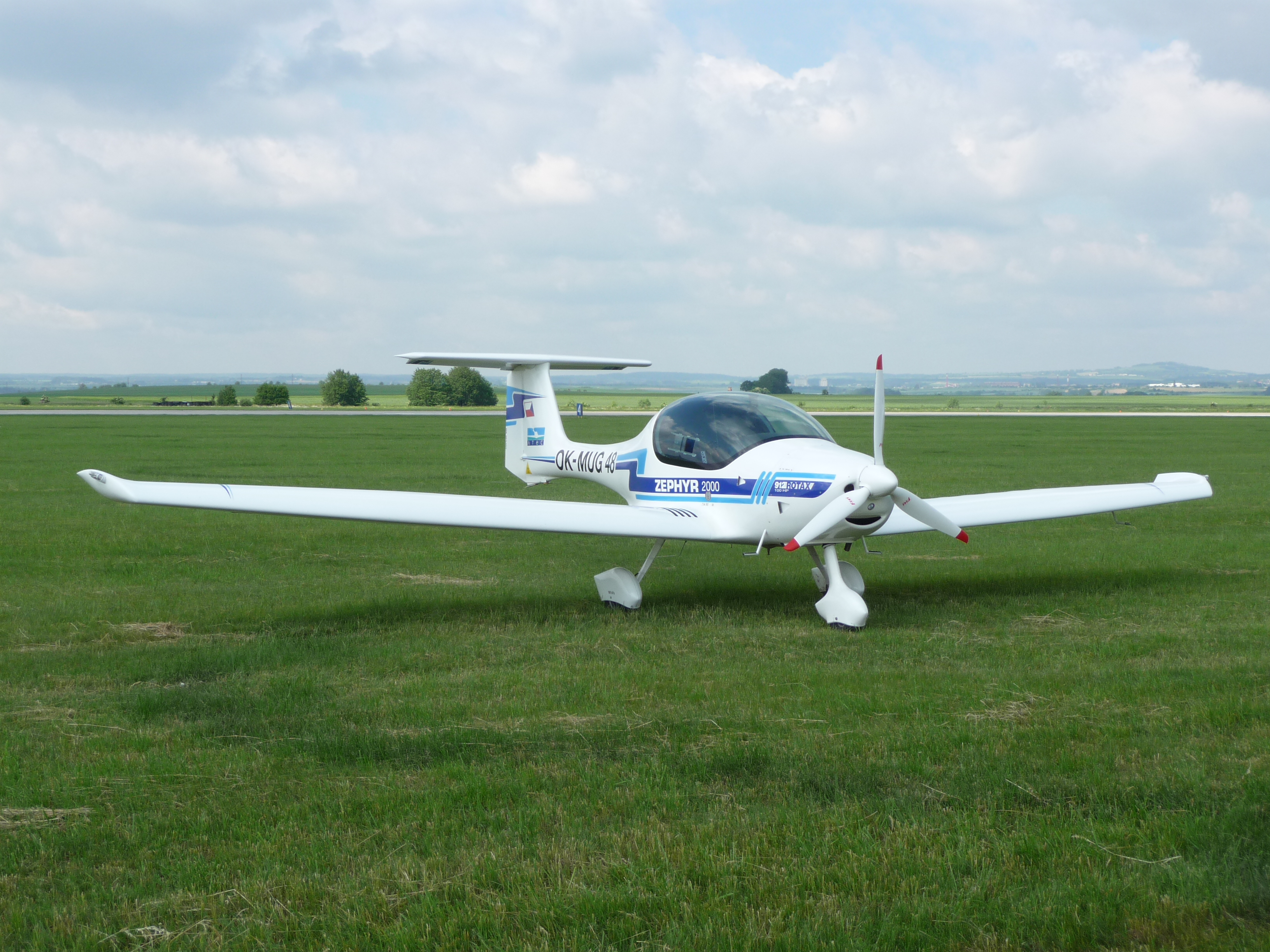

General information
- Type: Ultralight aircraft and Light-sport aircraft
- National origin: Czech Republic
- Manufacturer: ATEC v.o.s.
- Designer: Oldrich Olansky
- Status: In production
- Number built: more than 200

History
- Introduction date: 1996
- Variant: ATEC 321 Faeta

The ATEC 122 Zephyr 2000 is a Czech ultralight aircraft, designed by Oldrich Olansky and produced by ATEC v.o.s. of Libice nad Cidlinou. The aircraft is supplied as a complete ready-to-fly-aircraft or as a kit for amateur construction.

== Design and development ==
The Zephyr was designed to comply with the Fédération Aéronautique Internationale microlight rules. It features a cantilever low-wing, a two-seats-in-side-by-side configuration enclosed cockpit under a bubble canopy, fixed tricycle landing gear, a T-tail and a single engine in tractor configuration.

The aircraft's fuselage is made from composites with wooden bulkheads. The semi-tapered 9.6 m (31.5 ft) span wing is made from plywood with composite spars and leading edges and employs a UA-2 airfoil. The wing is covered with doped aircraft fabric. The standard engine factory-supplied was the 100 hp (75 kW) Rotax 912ULS four-stroke powerplant.

The Zephyr is noted for its low payload. With a useful load of 197.5 kg (435 lb) and full fuel of 43 kg (95 lb), this leaves only 154.3 kg (340 lb) for occupants and baggage.

The Zephyr was later developed into the ATEC 321 Faeta.

== Variants ==
Zephyr 2000
base model for FAI microlight category.
Zephyr 2550
Light-sport aircraft model

== Specifications (122 Zephyr 2000) ==
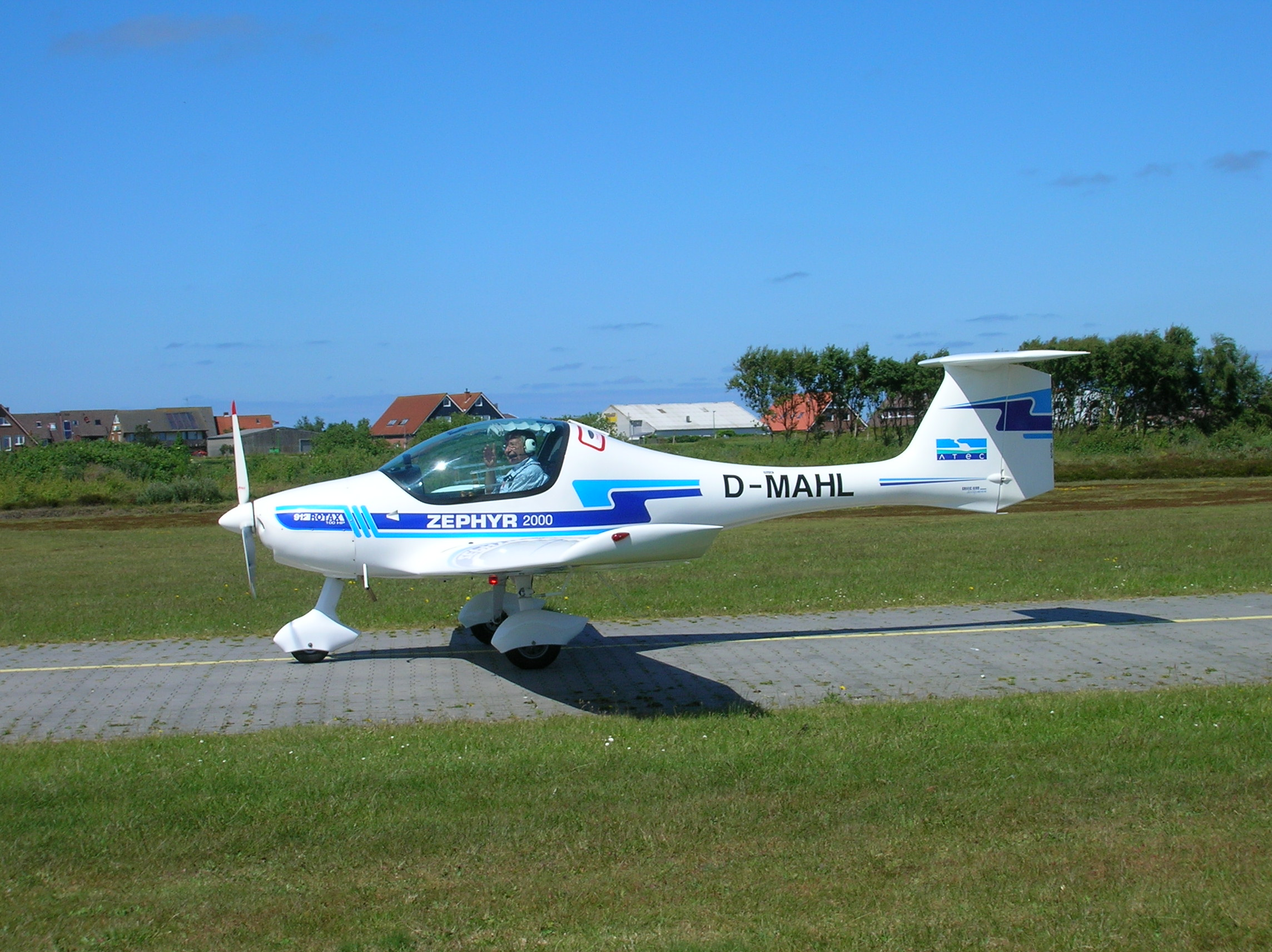
ATEC 122 Zephyr 2000

Data from Bertrand and Purdy

General characteristics

- Crew: one
- Capacity: one passenger
- Wingspan: 9.6 m (31 ft 6 in)
- Wing area: 10.07 m^{2} (108.4 sq ft)
- Airfoil: UA-2
- Empty weight: 275 kg (606 lb)
- Gross weight: 472.5 kg (1,042 lb)
- Fuel capacity: 60 litres (13 imp gal; 16 US gal)
- Powerplant: 1 × Rotax 912ULS four cylinder, liquid and air-cooled, four stroke, 75 kW (101 hp)

Performance

- Maximum speed: 265 km/h (165 mph, 143 kn)
- Cruise speed: 215 km/h (134 mph, 116 kn)
- Stall speed: 65 km/h (40 mph, 35 kn)
- Rate of climb: 6.5 m/s (1,280 ft/min)
- Wing loading: 46.92 kg/m^{2} (9.61 lb/sq ft)
