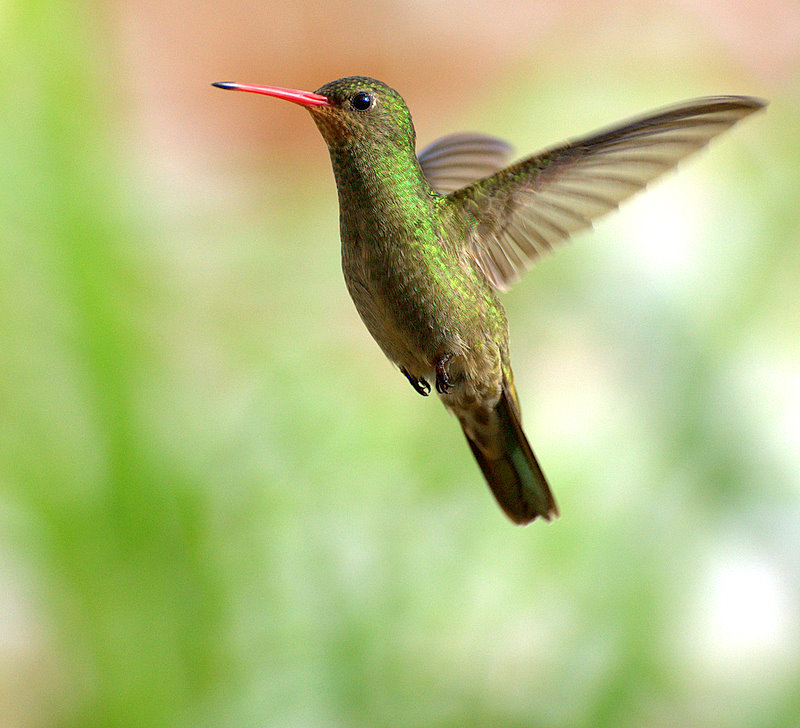
- Gilded sapphire (Hylocharis chrysura) photographed in São Paulo, Brazil.

Scientific classification
- Kingdom: Animalia
- Phylum: Chordata
- Class: Aves
- Clade: Strisores
- Order: Apodiformes
- Family: Trochilidae
- Tribe: Trochilini
- Genus: Hylocharis; Boie, F, 1831

Type species
- Trochilus sapphirinus (rufous-throated sapphire) Gmelin, JF, 1788

Species
- 2, see text

= Hylocharis =

Genus of birds

Hylocharis is a genus of hummingbirds, in the family Trochilidae. It contains two species that are both found in South America.

== Taxonomy ==
The genus Hylocharis was introduced in 1831 by the German naturalist Friedrich Boie. The type species was designated by the English zoologist George Robert Gray in 1840 as the rufous-throated sapphire. The genus name combines the Ancient Greek hulē meaning "woodland" or "forest" with kharis meaning "beauty".

This genus formerly included additional species. A molecular phylogenetic study published in 2014 found that the genus Hylocharis was polyphyletic. In the revised classification to create monophyletic genera, species were moved to Chrysuronia and Chlorestes.

The genus now contains the following two species:

Genus Hylocharis – Boie, F, 1831 – two species
Common name	Scientific name and subspecies	Range	Size and ecology	IUCN status and estimated population
Rufous-throated sapphire	Hylocharis sapphirina (Gmelin, JF, 1788)	Bolivia, Brazil, Colombia, Ecuador, the Guianas, Peru, Venezuela and possibly Argentina and Paraguay	Size: Habitat: Diet:	LC
Gilded sapphire	Hylocharis chrysura (Shaw, 1812)	Argentina, Bolivia, Brazil, Paraguay, and Uruguay.	Size: Habitat: Diet:	LC
