= Zephir =

Zephir may refer to:

- a fictional character associated with Babar the Elephant
- Flore Zéphir (1958-2017), Haitian American academic and author
- Thierry Zéphir (born 19??), French author and curator
- Richardson Zéphir (born 1977), Canadian stand-up comedian and actor

Vehicles and transportation

- Fouga Zéphir, a French carrier jet trainer
- Piel Zephir, a French racing airplane
- D-ARUN Zephir, a Lufthansa airliner, see Dornier Do 18
- French frigate Zéphir (1706), see List of French sail frigates
- German torpedo boat Zephir, see List of naval ships of Germany
- rail-road shunting vehicles manufacturer, see Rail car mover
- Zephir, a ship involved in the escape of Napoleon from Elba in 1815.

Other

- Zephir (programming language), a programming language based on PHP and C
- A Laser Doppler anemometer called ZephIR developed by QinetiQ and licensed to a Renewable Energy consultancy called Natural Power

== See also ==
- Zephyr (disambiguation)
- Zefir (disambiguation)
