= Zefir =

Zefir may refer to:

- Zefir (food), a Soviet Union type of confectionery similar to marshmallows
- SZD-19 Zefir, a 1957 Polish single-seat glider aircraft
- the original title for Zephyr, a 2010 Turkish drama film
- a peppermint cultivar

== See also ==
- Zephir (disambiguation)
- Zephyr (disambiguation)
