= Winter Island (disambiguation) =

Winter Island is an island in Massachusetts, United States, on the U.S. National Register of Historic Places. It may also refer to:

== Antarctica ==
- Winter Island (Antarctica)

== Canada ==
- Winter Island (Kitikmeot)
- Winter Island (Qikiqtaaluk)

== United States ==
- Winter Island (California)
