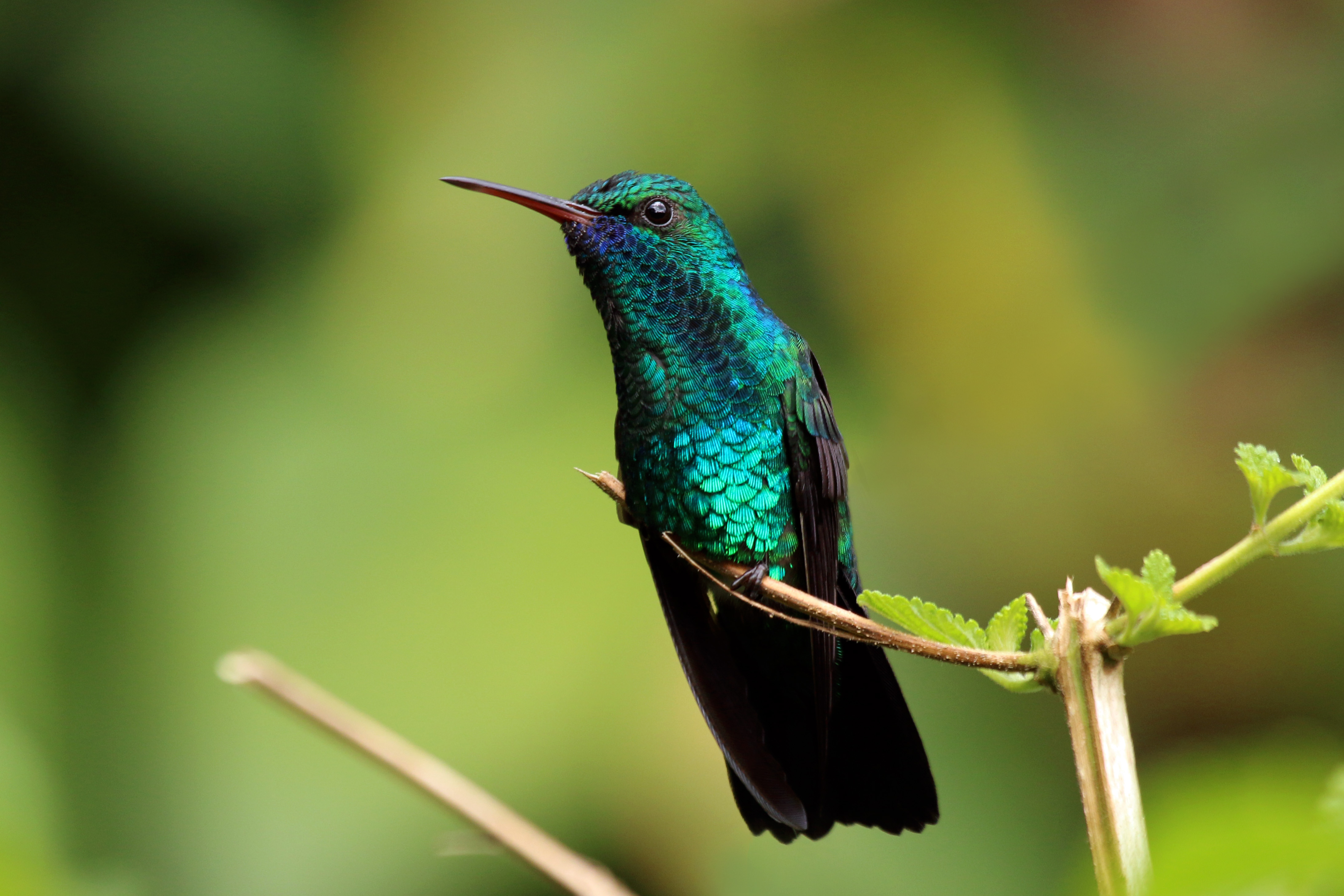
- Male C. n. notata, Trinidad

Conservation status
- Least Concern (IUCN 3.1)
- CITES Appendix II (CITES)

Scientific classification
- Kingdom: Animalia
- Phylum: Chordata
- Class: Aves
- Clade: Strisores
- Order: Apodiformes
- Family: Trochilidae
- Genus: Chlorestes
- Species: C. notata

Binomial name
- Chlorestes notata (Reich, 1793)

Synonyms
- Chlorostilbon notatus Trochilus notatus

= Blue-chinned sapphire =

Species of bird

The blue-chinned sapphire or blue-chinned emerald (Chlorestes notata) is a hummingbird that ranges from Colombia south and east to the Guianas, Trinidad and Tobago, Peru, and Brazil. There have been occasional records from Tobago. For Brazil, the species' range is along the main Amazon River Basin, as well as the Atlantic Forest, both in the northeast, as well as far south on the southeast coastal strip, (an entire coastal strip, north-east-south of about 3,000 km (1,900 mi)). It is sometimes placed in the genus Chlorostilbon.

It is a bird of forests and sometimes cultivated areas with large trees. The female lays her eggs in a deep cup nest, made of lichen and other fine plant material and placed on a horizontal tree branch. Incubation is 16 days with a further 18–19 days to fledging.

Blue-chinned sapphires feed on insects and nectar, mainly in trees but sometimes on vines, shrubs, herbs, epiphytes or smaller plants like Heliconia. The song is a high metallic ssooo-ssooo-ssooo.

== Description ==
The blue-chinned sapphire is 8.9 cm (3.5 in) long and weighs 3.8 g (1/8 oz). The bill is fairly straight, with the upper mandible black and the lower reddish. The male has mainly green plumage, darker above, with white thighs, a forked metallic blue tail and blue upper throat. The female differs from the male in that she has green-spotted white underparts.
