= Edward Parry (Royal Navy officer, born 1790) =

Royal Navy officer and explorer (1790–1855)

Rear-Admiral Sir Edward Parry FRS
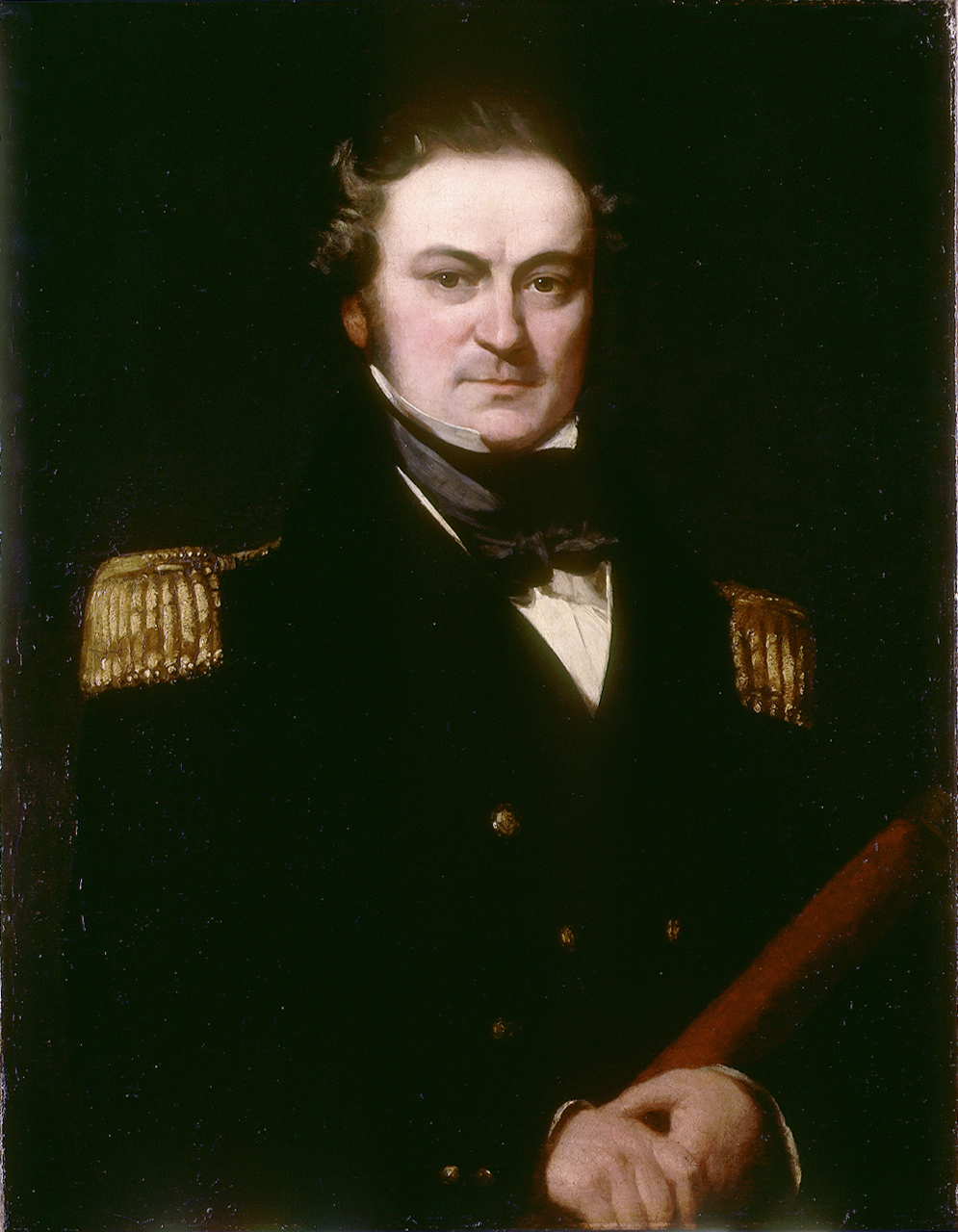
- Portrait by Charles Skottowe

Hydrographer of the Navy
- In office 1 December 1823 – 13 May 1829
- Preceded by: Thomas Hannaford Hurd
- Succeeded by: Sir Francis Beaufort

Personal details
- Born: William Edward Parry; 19 December 1790 Bath, Somerset, England
- Died: 8 July 1855 (aged 64) Bad Ems, Kingdom of Prussia
- Spouses: Isabella Louisa Stanley; Catherine Edwards Hoare
- Parent: Caleb Hillier Parry (father)
- Relatives: Charles Henry Parry (brother); Joshua Parry (grandfather); Edward Rigby (uncle)
- Education: King Edward's School
- Occupation: Arctic explorer, hydrographer
- Known for: Farthest North in 1827

Military service
- Branch: Royal Navy
- Service years: 1803–1855
- Rank: Rear-Admiral
- Wars: Anglo-American War

Sir William Edward Parry FRS (19 December 1790 – 8 July 1855) was a Royal Navy officer and explorer best known for his 1819–1820 expedition through the Parry Channel, probably the most successful in the long quest for the Northwest Passage, until it was finally negotiated by Roald Amundsen in 1906. In 1827, Parry attempted one of the earliest expeditions to the North Pole. He reached 82° 45' N, setting a record for human exploration Farthest North that stood for nearly five decades before being surpassed at 83° 20' N by Albert Hastings Markham in 1875.

== Early life ==
Parry was born in Bath, Somerset, the son of Caleb Hillier Parry and Sarah Rigby. He was educated at King Edward's School.

At the age of thirteen he joined the flagship of Admiral Sir William Cornwallis in the Channel fleet as a first-class volunteer, in 1806 became a midshipman, and in 1810 received promotion to the rank of lieutenant in the frigate Alexander, which spent the next three years in the protection of the Spitsbergen whale fishery.

Parry took advantage of this opportunity to study and practice astronomical observations in northern latitudes, and later published the results of his studies in a small volume titled Nautical Astronomy by Night. From 1813 to 1817, he served on the North American Station. He received the Naval General Service Medal with the Boat Service Clasp for his part in leading the destruction of twenty-seven American privateering vessels in the Connecticut River at Essex, Connecticut, on 8 April 1814, during the War of 1812.

== Arctic exploration ==
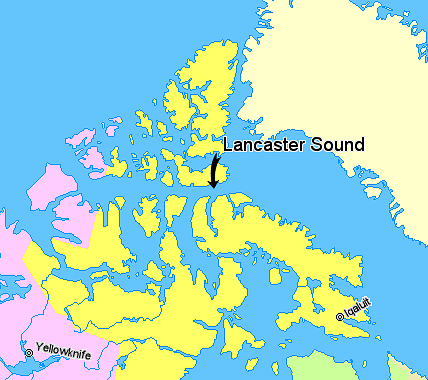
Parry Channel runs west from Lancaster Sound. Melville Island is the westernmost yellow-and-pink island on the north side.

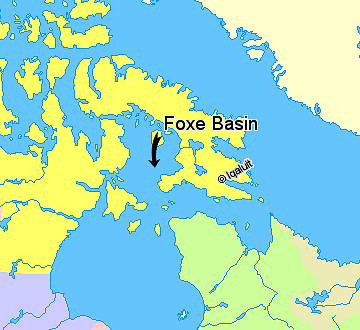
Foxe Basin. Melville Peninsula on the west between Frozen Strait (south) and Fury and Hecla Strait (north)

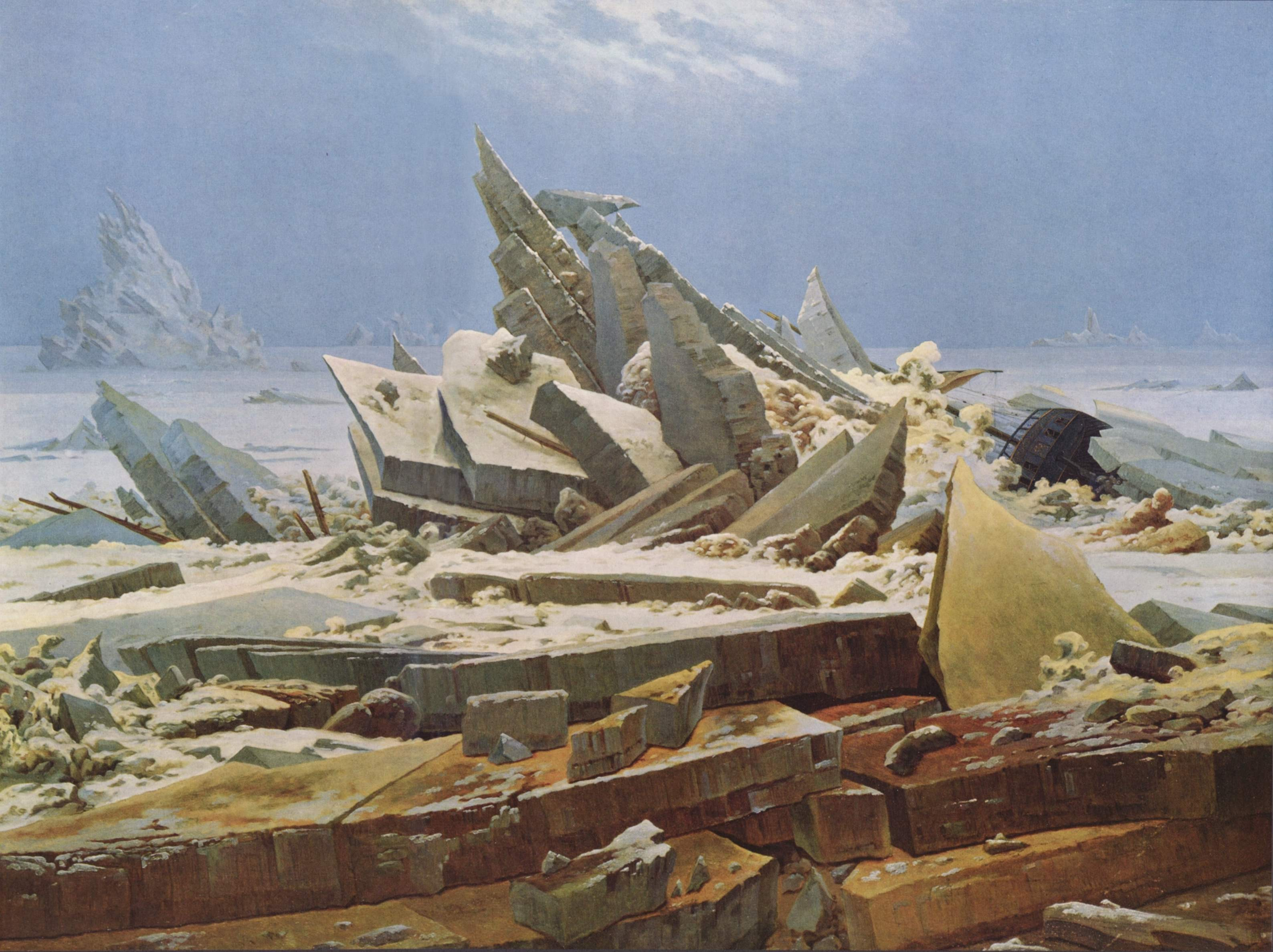
"Das Eismeer" (The Sea of Ice) by Caspar David Friedrich, 1823–4, was inspired by Parry's account from the 1819–1820 expedition. The harsh nature (e.g. the shipwreck) and radical composition, however, caused it to remain unsold until the death of the artist in 1840.

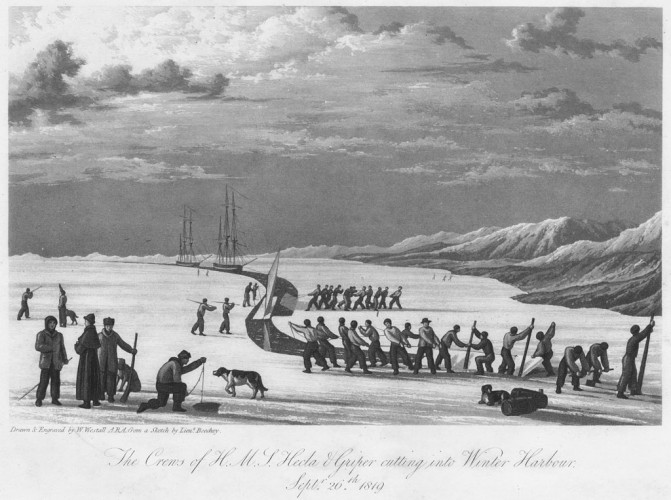
"The Crews of H.M.S. Hecla & Griper Cutting into Winter Harbour, 26 Sept. 1819". An engraving from the journal published in 1821.

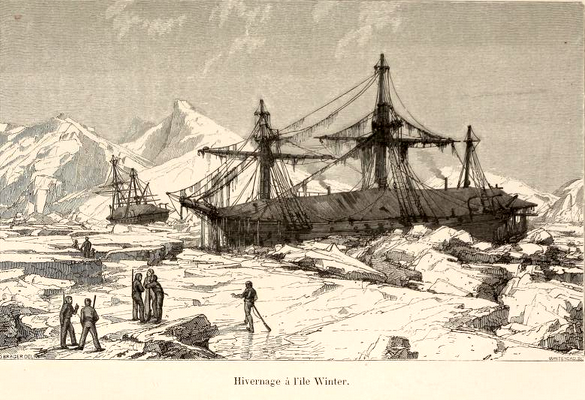
Winter Island by Jean-Baptiste Henri Durand-Brager

=== 1818: Baffin Bay ===
In 1818 he received command of the brig Alexander in the Arctic expedition under Captain John Ross. This expedition followed the coast of Baffin Bay without making any new discoveries.

=== 1819: Halfway across the Arctic ===
Parry and many others thought that Ross was wrong to turn back after entering Lancaster Sound at the north end of Baffin Island. Partly as a result, Parry was given command of a new expedition in HMS Hecla, accompanied by the slower HMS Griper under Matthew Liddon. Others on the expedition were Edward Sabine, science officer and Frederick William Beechey. For protection from ice the ships were clad with 3-inch (7.6 cm) oak, had iron plates on their bows and internal cross-beams.

They also carried food in tin cans, an invention so new that there were as yet no can openers. Instead of taking Ross's route anti-clockwise around Baffin Bay (which Ross was charting) he was able to cross the bay straight to Lancaster Sound. Fighting his way through ice he reached clear water on 28 July and entered Lancaster Sound. He passed Ross's farthest west and kept going. Blocked by heavy ice, they went south for more than 100 miles (160 km) into Prince Regent Inlet before turning back.

Continuing west they passed 110° W (about 600 miles (970 km) west of Lancaster Strait) which entitled them to a £5,000 award offered by Parliament. Finally blocked by ice they turned back to a place Parry called Winter Harbour on the south shore of Melville Island, somewhere near 107- or 108° W. Cutting their way through new ice the ships reached anchorage on 26 September.

Here they were frozen in for the next 10 months. There were three months of total darkness and in the new year the temperature dropped to −54 °F (−48 °C). The men were kept busy with regular exercise while the officers put on plays and produced a newspaper. The first case of scurvy was reported in January and by March fourteen men were on the sick list, about half with mild scurvy. Parry carried mustard and cress seeds and planted them in his cabin. The leaves seemed to help.

There was some excitement in early March when the first melt water appeared, but by the end of the month the ice was still 6 feet (2 m) thick. In June Parry led a group of men dragging a wooden cart to the north shore of the island which he named Hecla and Griper Bay. It was the first of August before the ships were able to float out of the harbour. They got as far west as 113°46'W before turning back. It was too late in the season and new ice was already beginning to form. They reached England in October 1820 having lost one man.

Parry's voyage, which had taken him through the Parry Channel three-quarters of the way across the Canadian Arctic Archipelago was probably the single most productive voyage in the quest for the Northwest Passage. Luck was on their side; 1819 was unusually ice-free and no ship was able to travel so far west until Edward Belcher's expedition in 1850. A narrative of the expedition, entitled Journal of a Voyage to discover a North-west Passage, appeared in 1821, publisher John Murray paying 1,000 guineas for it. Upon his return Lieutenant Parry received promotion to the rank of commander. He was elected a Fellow of the Royal Society in February 1821.

=== 1821: West side of Foxe Basin ===
In April 1821 he again left for the Arctic commanding HMS Fury accompanied by HMS Hecla under George Francis Lyon. Others with him were George Fisher, scientist and chaplain, William Hooper, purser and diarist, lieutenant Henry Parkyns Hoppner and then midshipmen Francis Crozier and James Clark Ross. Experience from the previous voyage led to improvements. The two vessels were nearly identical since Gripper had not been able to keep up with Hecla, and all the equipment was made to be entirely interchangeable. They had cork insulation, cork plugs for the portholes and an improved heating system, coal-burning stove, placed in the lowest deck to deal with cold and condensation. The men were issued better clothing and lemon juice was stored in kegs rather than glass bottles.

The goal this time was to find a passage near the northwest end of Hudson Bay. After working slowly through the ice of Hudson Strait he headed directly west to Frozen Strait which Christopher Middleton had found impassable in 1742. He passed Frozen Strait in a fog and found himself in Repulse Bay which he re-checked and found land-locked. He then ran northeast and mapped the coast of the Melville Peninsula and wintered at the southeast corner of Winter Island. From the Inuit he learned that northward the coast turned west.

In March and May Lyon led two sledging expeditions into the interior. Freed from the ice in July they then went north and found the Fury and Hecla Strait, which was ice-filled. They waited for the ice to clear, but it did not. In September Lieutenant Reid trekked 100 miles (160 km) west along the Strait to the ice-filled Gulf of Boothia, the north end of which Parry had approached in 1819. When new ice began to form they went a short distance southeast and wintered at Igloolik.

The ship was not freed from ice until 8 August. Since it was late in the season and there were signs of scurvy, Parry turned for home and reached Shetland in mid-October 1823. During his absence, he had been promoted to post rank in November 1821, and shortly after his return he was appointed acting Hydrographer of the Navy. His Journal of a Second Voyage, &c., appeared in 1824.

=== 1824: Loss of Fury at Prince Regent Inlet ===
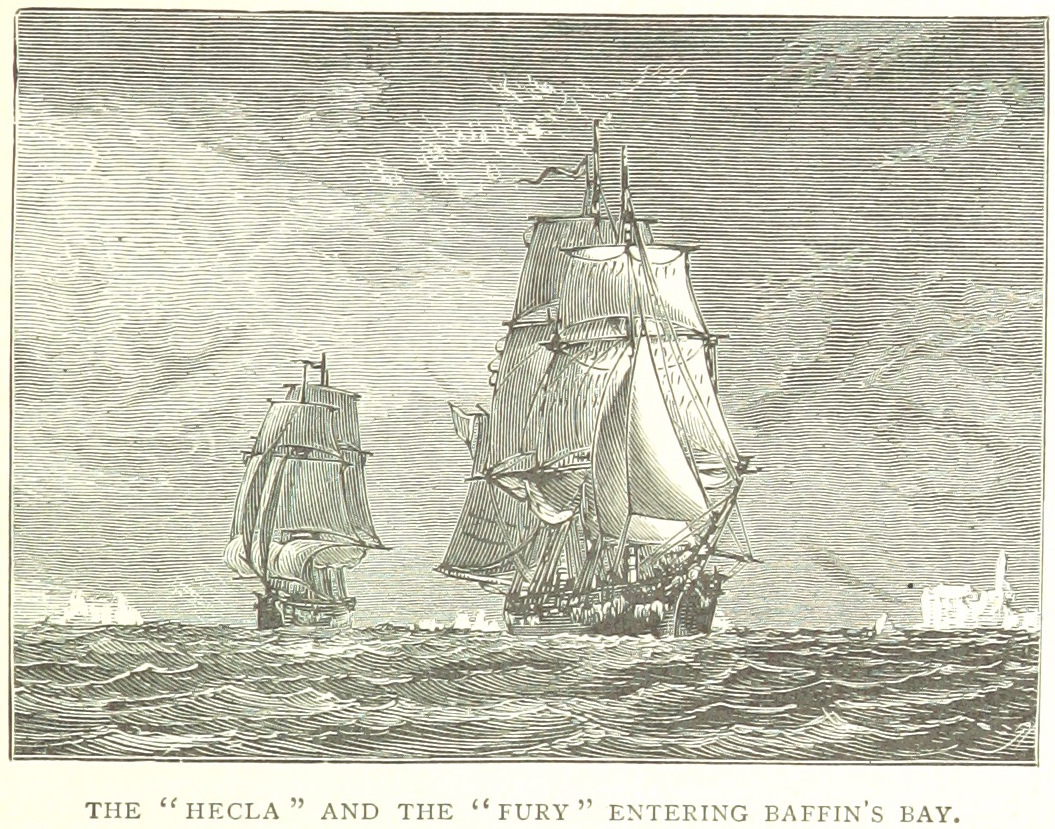
HMS Hecla and HMS Fury enter Baffin Bay during the 1824 expedition

In May 1824 he left London in the Hecla accompanied by Henry Parkyns Hoppner in the Fury. With them were Horatio Thomas Austin, James Clark Ross, Francis Crozier and William Hooper. The goal this time was Prince Regent Inlet at the west end of Baffin Island where he had been blocked by ice in 1819. It was a bad year for ice and he did not reach Lancaster Sound until 10 September. He entered Prince Regent Inlet but after 60 miles (97 km) of ice he was forced to winter at a place he called Port Bowen on the eastern shore.

In late July 1825 they freed themselves from the ice, but 60 miles (97 km) further south they were caught by wind and ice and the Fury was driven against the western shore and damaged by the ensuing pressure. After 48 hours work on the pumps they made an attempt to deliberately beach the ship for repairs. Stores were unloaded, but by 25 August it was clear that the keel was broken and the advancing ice forced them to abort further efforts. Most of the stores were left on the beach and the crew taken on board the Hecla which reached England in October 1825. Parry thought he could see open water south of the wreck site. He published an account of this voyage in 1826.

The wreck site, Fury Beach, near 72°30′N 92°30′W where the coast turns west became an important landmark. Sir John Ross reached it in 1829. He found the hulk gone and many stores, Fury's boats and anchors piled on the beach. When his ship was frozen in further south he depended on those stores before being rescued. In 1850, Charles Codrington Forsyth reached it but was blocked by ice.

=== Farthest North record ===
In the following year Parry obtained the sanction of the Admiralty for an attempt on the North Pole from the northern shores of Spitsbergen at Sjuøyane. On 23 October 1826, Parry married Isabella Louisa Stanley, daughter of John Stanley, 1st Baron Stanley of Alderley, before undertaking the expedition.

In 1827, he reached 82°45′N, which remained the highest latitude attained for the next 49 years. He published an account of this journey under the title of Narrative of the Attempt to reach the North Pole, &c..

== Later career ==
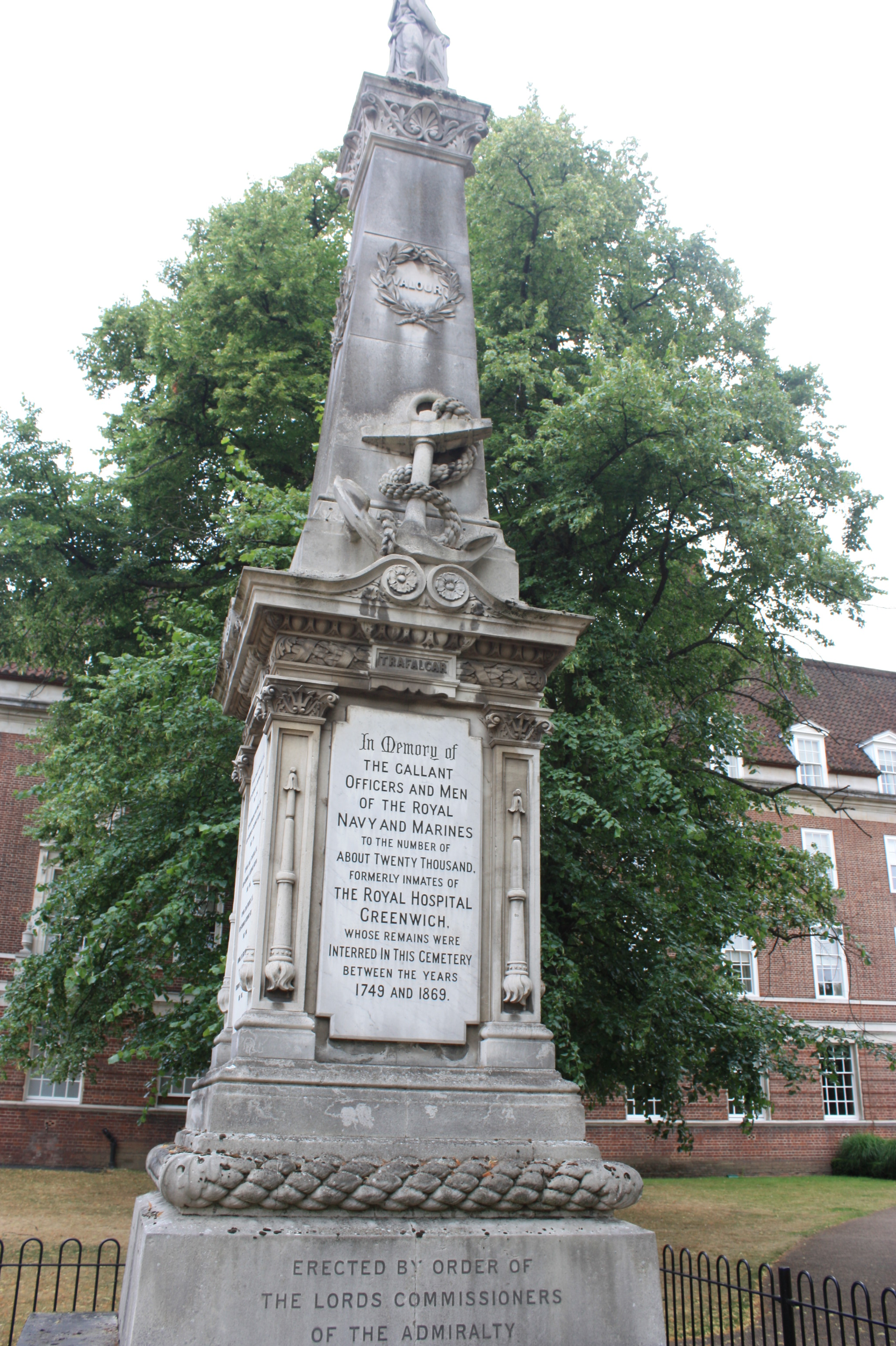
The Officers Monument near the site of Greenwich Hospital in east London

In April 1829 he was knighted. Parry served as Commissioner of the Australian Agricultural Company based at Tahlee on the northern shore of Port Stephens, New South Wales, from 1829 to 1834.

Parry was subsequently selected for the post of comptroller of the newly created department of steam machinery of the Navy, and held this office until his retirement from active service in 1846, when he was appointed captain-superintendent of Haslar Hospital. He reorganised the packet service, which had been transferred from the Post Office to the Admiralty in January 1837. Steamship companies were contracted to carry the mail, instead of naval vessels, on a regular schedule.

He attained the rank of rear-admiral in 1852, and in the following year became a governor of Greenwich Hospital, and retained this post until his death.

He died after a long illness at Bad Ems in Germany on 8 July 1855, but his body was returned to London for burial. He is buried in Greenwich Hospital Cemetery. The cemetery is now largely cleared to create a pocket park but he is named on the west face of the Officers Monument in the centre of the area.

== Legacy ==
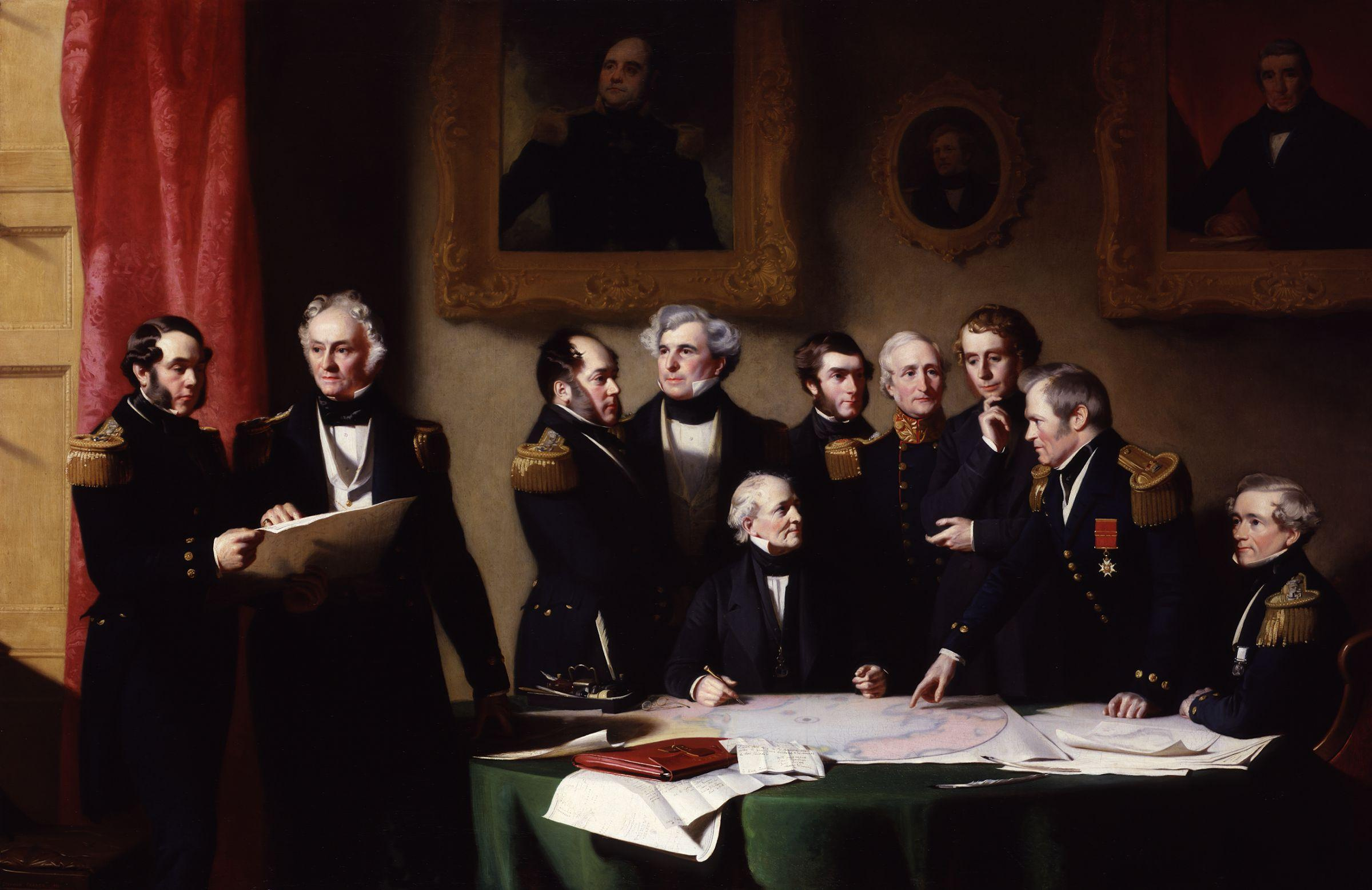
The Arctic Council Planning a Search for Sir John Franklin by Stephen Pearce, 1851

Parry's character was influenced by his religiousness, and besides the journals of his different voyages he also wrote a Lecture to Seamen, and Thoughts on the Parental Character of God (1878, co-author). He was noted as "an evangelical [Christian] and an ardent advocate of moral reform in the navy."

Parry also pioneered the use of canning techniques for food preservation on his Arctic voyages. However, his techniques were not infallible: in 1939 viable spores of certain heat-resistant bacteria were found in canned roast veal that had travelled with Parry to the Arctic Circle in 1824.

The crater Parry on the Moon was named after him, as were Parry County, New South Wales, Parry Sound, Ontario, and the optical phenomenon Parry arc, documented by him during the 1819–1821 expedition.

In 1930, a large sandstone rock at Winter Harbour on Melville Island marking Parry's 1819 wintering site, approximately 5.5-metre-long (18 ft) and 3-metre-high (9.8 ft), was designated a National Historic Site of Canada.

Parry Street in Cooks Hill is named after him due to his work at the A A Company.

== Contributions to botany ==
Parry was cited as the author of some plant species of Greenland in the following documents:

- Journal of a Voyage for the Discovery of a North-West Passage from the Atlantic to the Pacific; Performed in the years 1819–'20, in His Majecty's Ships Hecla and Griper ... with an Appendix Containing the Scientific and Other Observations... London (1821)
- Journal of a Second Voyage for the Discovery of a North-West Passage from the Atlantic to the Pacific; Performed in the Years 1821-22-23, in His Majesty's Ships Fury and Hecla, under the Orders of Captain William Edward Parry... London (1824)
- Supplement to the Appendix of Captain Parry's First Voyage (1824)
- Appendix to Captain Parry's Journal of a Second Voyage for the Discovery of a North-West Passage from the Atlantic to the Pacific, Performed in His Majesty's Ships Fury and Hecla in the Years 1821–22–23 ... London (1825)
- Journal of a Third Voyage for the Discovery of a North-West Passage from the Atlantic to the Pacific; Performed in the Years 1824-25 in His Majesty's Ships Hecla and Fury, Under the Orders of Captain William Edward Parry... London (1826)

== See also ==
- Arctic exploration
  - Farthest North
  - Northwest Passage
- List of Arctic expeditions
