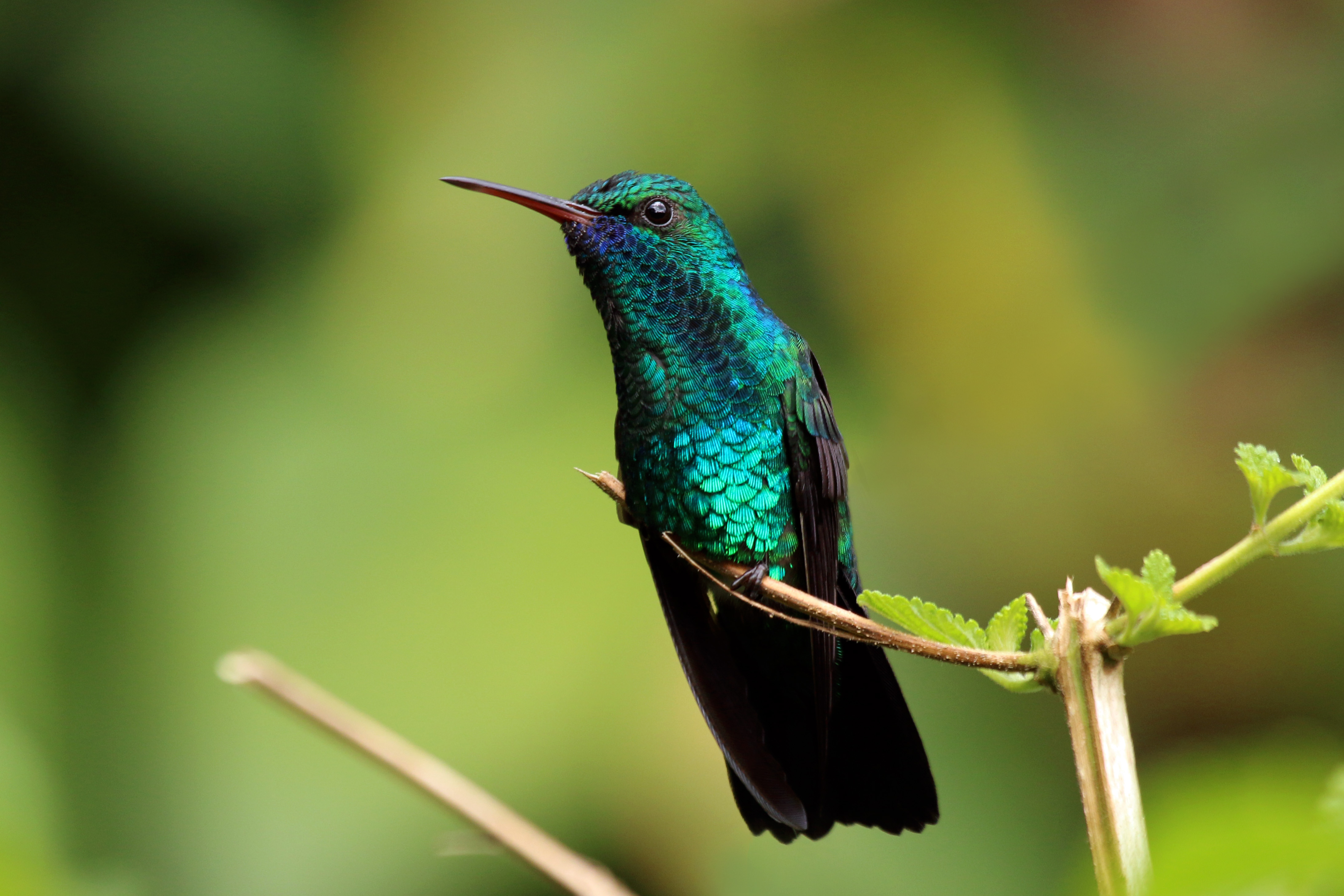
- Blue-chinned sapphire, (Chlorestes notata)

Scientific classification
- Kingdom: Animalia
- Phylum: Chordata
- Class: Aves
- Order: Apodiformes
- Family: Trochilidae
- Tribe: Trochilini
- Genus: Chlorestes; Reichenbach, 1854

Type species
- Trochilus caeruleus Vieillot, 1817

Species
- 5, see text

= Chlorestes =

Genus of birds

Chlorestes is a genus of hummingbirds.

== Species ==
The genus contains five species:

Genus Chlorestes – Reichenbach, 1854 – five species
Common name	Scientific name and subspecies	Range	Size and ecology	IUCN status and estimated population
White-bellied emerald	Chlorestes candida (Bourcier & Mulsant, 1846) Three subspecies: C. c. candida; C. c. genini; C. c. pacifica	Belize, Guatemala, Honduras, Panama, Mexico, and Nicaragua	Size: Habitat: Diet:	LC
Blue-throated sapphire	Chlorestes eliciae (Bourcier & Mulsant, 1846) Two subspecies: C. e. eliciae; C. e. earina	Belize, Colombia, Costa Rica, El Salvador, Guatemala, Honduras, Mexico, Nicaragua, and Panama	Size: Habitat: Diet:	LC
White-chinned sapphire	Chlorestes cyanus (Vieillot, 1818)	Bolivia, Brazil, Colombia, French Guiana, Guyana, Peru, Suriname, Venezuela	Size: Habitat: Diet:	LC
Violet-bellied hummingbird	Chlorestes julie (Bourcier, 1843)	Colombia, Ecuador, Panama	Size: Habitat: Diet:	LC
Blue-chinned sapphire	Chlorestes notata (Reich, 1793)	Brazil, Colombia, Ecuador, French Guiana, Guyana, Peru, Suriname, Trinidad and Tobago, Venezuela	Size: Habitat: Diet:	LC

This genus formerly included only the blue-chinned sapphire. Additional species were moved to this genus based on a molecular phylogenetic study of the hummingbirds published in 2014.
