= Caleb Hillier Parry =

Anglo-Welsh physician (1755–1822)

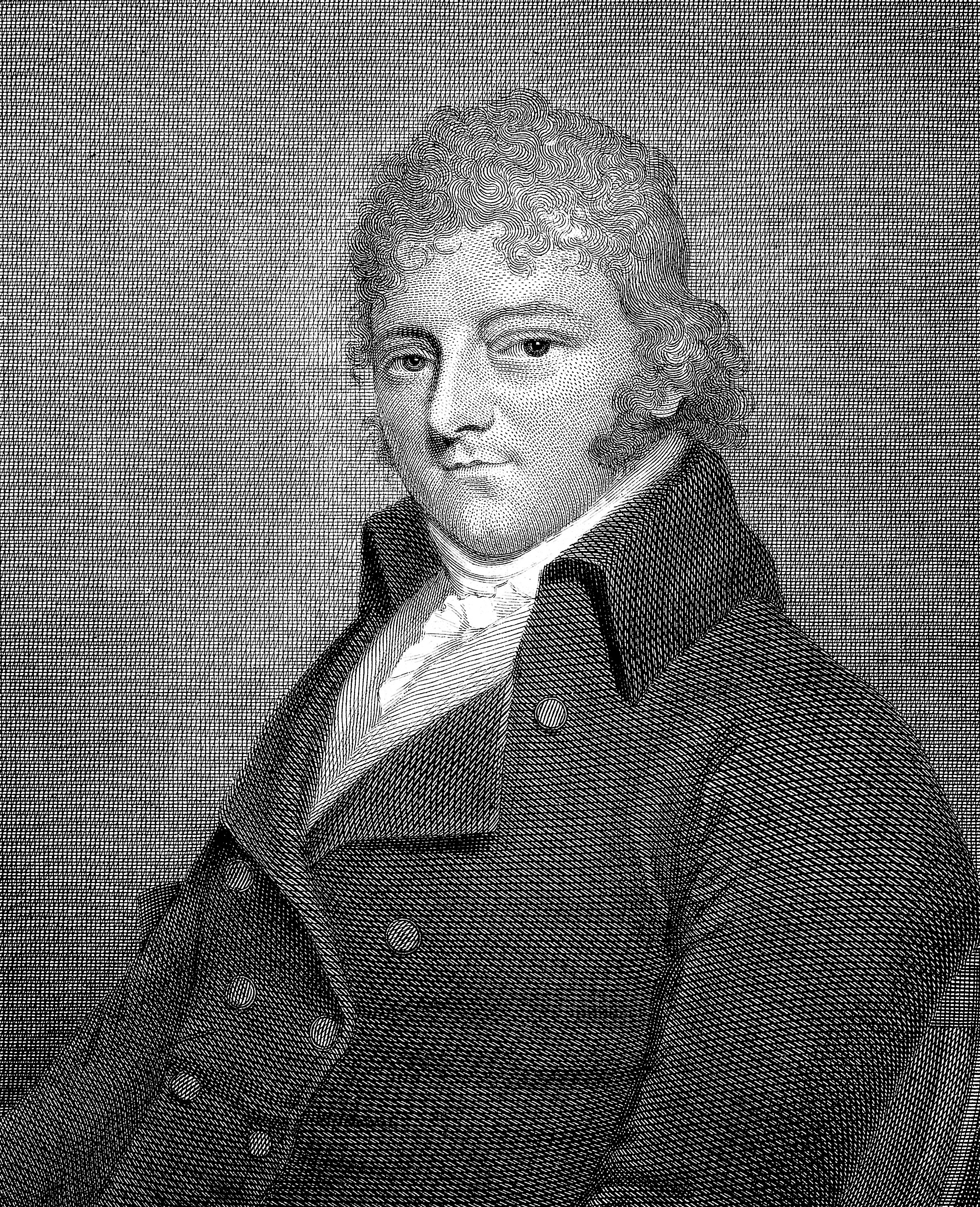
- Born: October 21, 1755; Cirencester, Gloucestershire, England
- Died: March 9, 1822 (aged 66); Bath, England

Caleb Hillier Parry (21 October 1755 – 9 March 1822) was an Anglo-Welsh medical doctor credited with the first report of Parry–Romberg syndrome, published in 1815, and one of the earliest descriptions of the exophthalmic goiter, published in 1825.

== Life ==
Born in Cirencester, Gloucestershire, on 21 October 1755, Parry was eldest son of Joshua Parry, a minister, and Sarah Hillier, daughter of Caleb Hillier of Upcott, Devon. He was educated first at a private school in Cirencester, and in 1770 entered Warrington Academy, where he stayed for three years. In 1773, Parry began studying medicine at Edinburgh. He continued his studies for two years in London, where he lived with Thomas Denman the obstetric physician. Returning to Edinburgh in 1777, Parry graduated M.D. in June 1778.

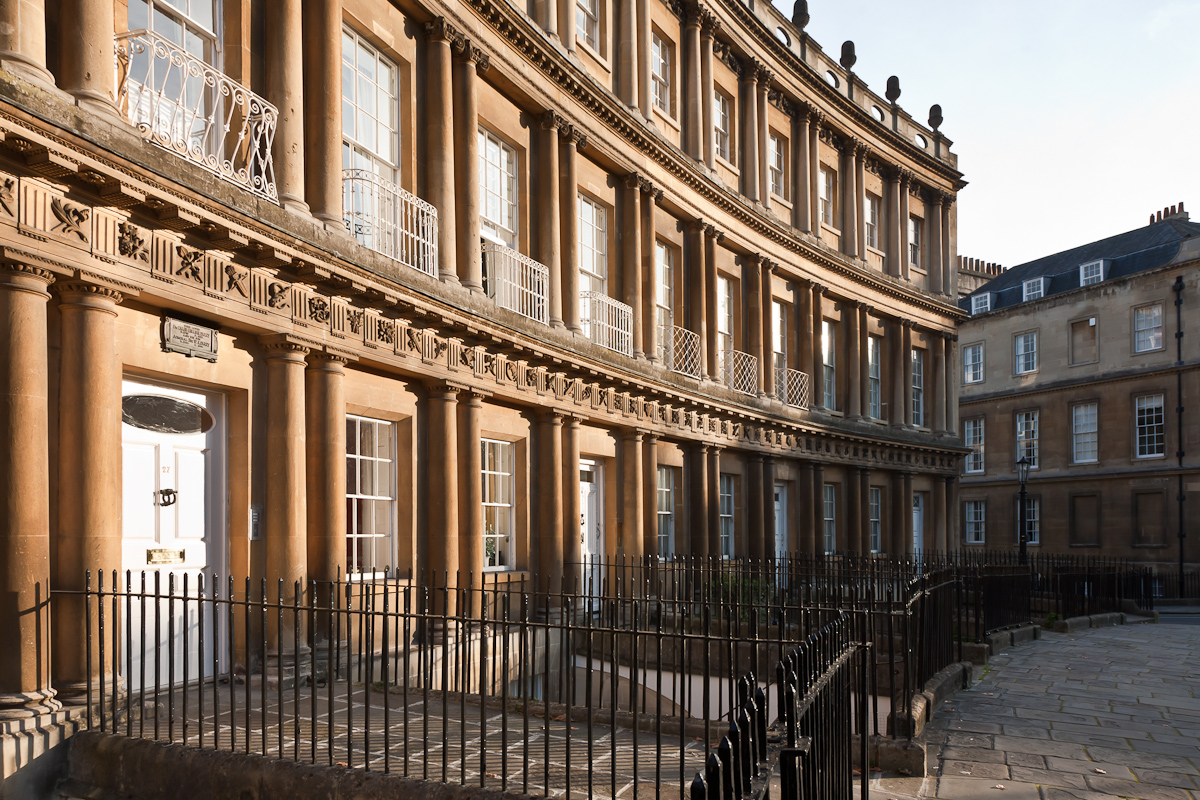
Caleb Hillier Parry's house, in the "Circus", Bath

Parry was admitted licentiate of the Royal College of Physicians of London in September 1778. Parry was appointed President of the Edinburgh Medical Society, and helped to procure its Royal Charter.

In November 1779, Parry became a physician at Bath General Hospital in Bath, Somerset, where he remained for the rest of his life. In 1789 Parry commissioned John Eveleigh to build a house "Summer Hill Place" at what is now Sion Hill Place. In 1800, Parry was elected a Fellow of the Royal Society.

In October 1816, Parry suffered a stroke, which paralyzed the right side of his body and impaired his speech. For the rest of his life, he read, dictated reminiscences, and supervised his farm and gardens.

Parry died in Bath on 9 March 1822 and was buried in Bath Abbey. The medical professionals of Bath commissioned a monument to his memory in the Abbey.

== Works ==
Parry's doctoral dissertation was titled De Rabie Contagiosa. Parry dedicated the work to Lord Bathurst of Cirencester, a close friend of his father.

Parry habitually noted down case histories. Using these notes, Parry published Elements of Pathology in 1815 before he became disabled. In 1825, Parry's son, Charles Henry Parry, republished Elements along with an unfinished second volume, as Elements of Pathology and Therapeutics.

Parry contributed to publications including the Philosophical Transactions and the Transactions of the Medical Society of London.

Parry also researched several special subjects:

- Inquiry into the Symptoms and Causes of the Syncope Anginosa, called Angina Pectoris, Bath, 1799; it contains observations by Edward Jenner.
- Cases of Tetanus and Rabies Contagiosa, or Canine Hydrophobia, Bath, 1814,
- The Nature, Cause, and Varieties of the Arterial Pulse, Bath, 1816, based mainly on animal experimentation. Charles Parry defended and expanded his father's work in Additional Experiments on the Arteries, London, 1819.

After Parry's death, Charles Parry published Collections from the Unpublished Writings of Dr. Parry, 2 vols. London, 1825.

Parry also devoted attention to the improvement of agriculture and studied the subject on a farm he had acquired near Bath. He was interested in the introduction of the merino sheep breed into Great Britain. He wrote in 1800 a tract on The Practicability and Advantage of producing in the British Isles Clothing-wool equal to that of Spain, and in 1807 an Essay on the Merino Breed of Sheep, which obtained a prize from the Board of Agriculture. Parry's papers appeared in the Transactions of the Bath and West of England Society of Agriculture, from 1786 onwards, and in the Farmers' Journal for 1812.

== Family ==
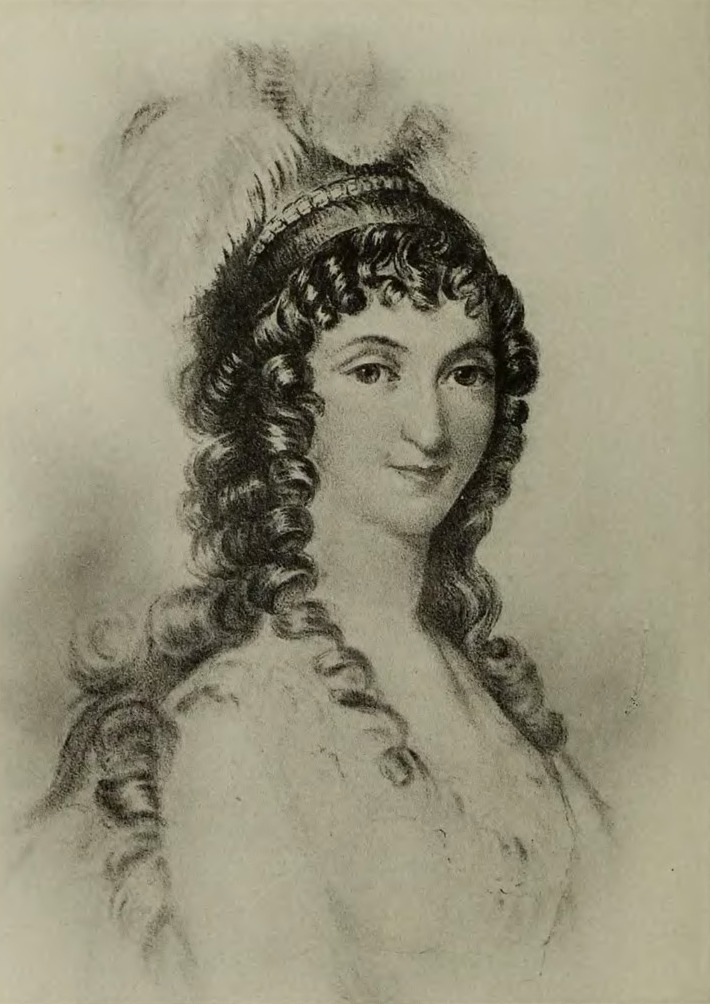
Sarah Rigby

In 1778, Parry married Sarah Rigby, the daughter of John Rigby of Manchester and the sister of Edward Rigby. The Parrys had nine children. Their eldest son, Charles Henry Parry, was a physician, and their youngest son, Admiral Sir William Edward Parry, was an Arctic explorer. Parry's daughter Sarah Matilda Parry was a botanical illustrator. Daughter Emma Parry married Sir John Eardley-Wilmot, 1st Baronet, and daughter Mary Parry married Thomas Garnier.
