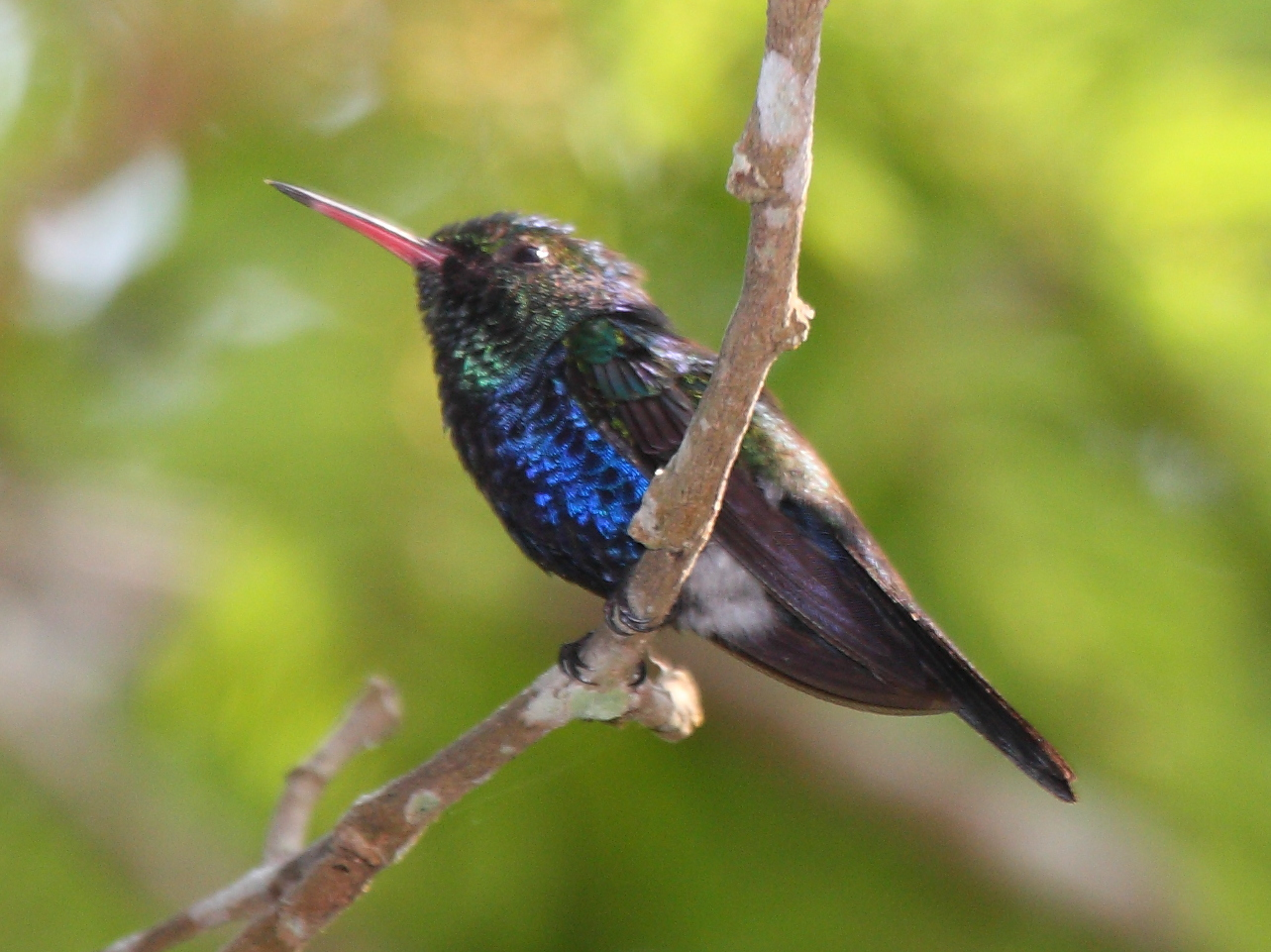

Conservation status
- Least Concern (IUCN 3.1)
- CITES Appendix II

Scientific classification
- Kingdom: Animalia
- Phylum: Chordata
- Class: Aves
- Order: Apodiformes
- Family: Trochilidae
- Genus: Chlorestes
- Species: C. julie

Binomial name
- Chlorestes julie (Bourcier, 1843)

Synonyms
- Juliamyia julie, Damophila julie

= Violet-bellied hummingbird =

Species of bird

The violet-bellied hummingbird (Chlorestes julie) is a species of hummingbird characterized by the male's shimmering violet belly.

== Taxonomy and systematics ==
The scientific name of this bird is currently Chlorestes julie, however, it was previously described as Juliamyia julie. Its genus being Chlorestes which is in the hummingbird family: Trochilidae. This family belongs to the order Apodiformes which includes hummingbirds and swifts. Within this species rank are three subspecies: panamensis, julie, and feliciana. Each are only separated by very minute features. Chlorestes julie panamensis occurs in Panama and has a head the same dull metallic green color as its back. Chlorestes julie julie and feliciana both have a brilliant green metallic back although julie has a shorter bill (14.5 mm) and a bluer belly whereas feliciana has a longer bill (15.1 mm) and a more violet belly. While julie occurs in Northern Colombia, feliciana occurs in western Ecuador and the extremely northwestern parts of Peru.

== Description ==
The violet-bellied hummingbird is characterized by the male's shimmering violet belly. The rest of its body is just as brilliant; its back and crown being a metallic green. The violet belly, however, is not shared between the sexes as this species exhibits sexual dimorphism. The characteristics they do share include long, rounded tails, straight and short bills, and pink lower mandibles.

=== Plumage ===
Adult:

- The male violet-bellied hummingbird is more brightly colored than its female counterpart. Its breast and belly is a violet blue while its back, crown, and throat is a metallic green. While the rump is more of a bronze green. The rectrices are a blue black while the belly and undertail coverts are a dull black with a blue/green sheen. Around the tibia are white tufts which are framed by partly white spots on its belly. The feathers on its wings are dusky with a purple sheen. On average males are 7.5 cm long and weigh 3.4 g.
- The female violet-bellied hummingbird is more dull than its male counterpart. Though its back, crown, and throat, is a similar metallic bronze green, its belly is a pale gray rather than a bright violet. Its rump and uppertail coverts are more bronze than green while undertail coverts are a dull brown gray. The rectrices can also be a blue black or a blueish green, and the outer rectrices are tipped with pale gray. Similar to the males, the females' wings are dusky with a purple sheen. Commonly in subspecies panamensis, the sides of the throat may be spotted with metallic green. On average females are 7 cm long and weigh 3.0 g.

Juvenile plumage has only been documented for immature males. They appear similar to an adult female although they may have some patches of violet on their belly or a sparkling green foreneck.

The molt pattern of this species is also yet to be described.

=== Similar species ===
Violet-bellied hummingbirds are very easily confused with woodnymphs. The green crowned woodnymph, in particular, has a similar color and shape and their ranges overlap. To tell them apart, you must check their size, color, and tail; violet-bellied hummingbirds are smaller, their backs are green instead of violet, and their tails are rounded, not notched. Green crowned woodnymphs also have a violet forecrown. Another similar species is the Sapphire-throated Hummingbird because of its colors. However, it has a blue throat, a green belly, and a notched tail.

== Distribution and habitat ==
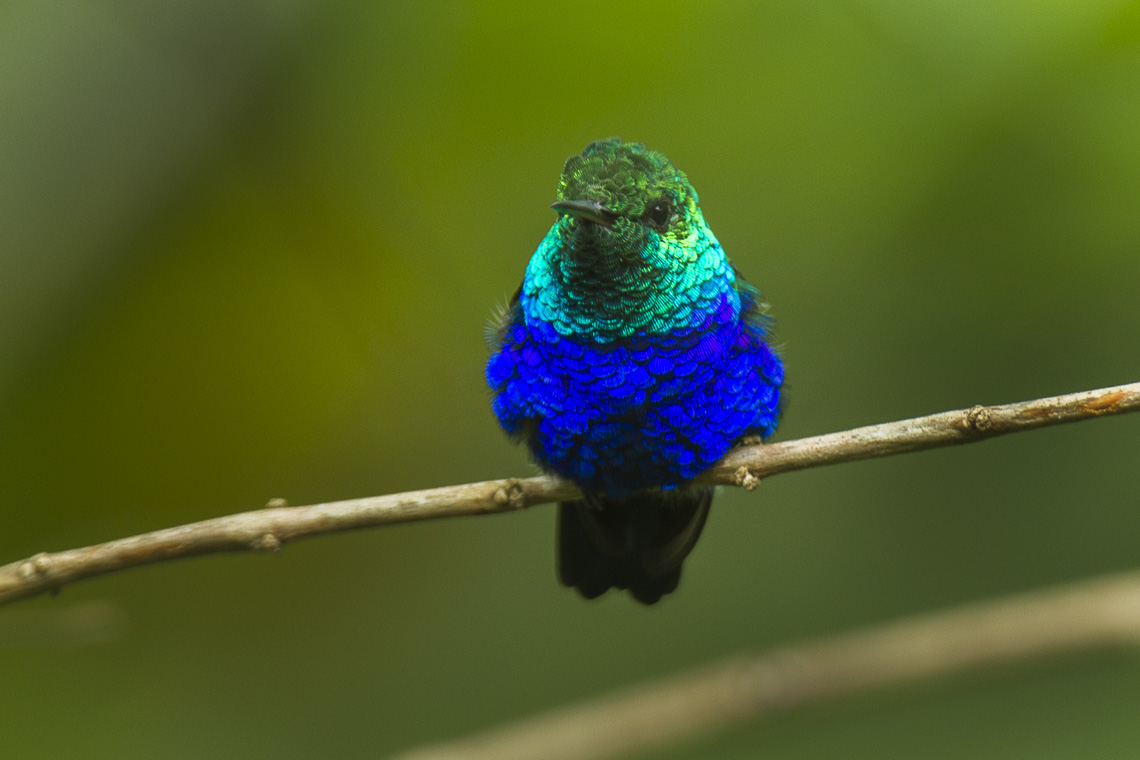
A male violet-bellied hummingbird perched on a tree branch.

Violet-bellied hummingbirds are found in central Panama, through Colombia, extending to southwestern Ecuador and the extreme northwestern point of Peru. Different subspecies have different habitats within this range (see Taxonomy and Systematics section). None of which experience seasonal migration. This species is present in the understory of humid deciduous forests, forest edges, and regrowth forests.

== Behavior and ecology ==
=== Breeding ===
As with many species of hummingbirds, violet-bellied hummingbirds seem to be polygynous. Males mate with multiple females and attract them by singing on perches about 1–10 m high. They may also fly in a 'u' shape in front of the females. However, after mating, they leave the female to rear the young. Individuals do not mate for life nor do they aggregate in flocks.

The females are responsible for creating nests and rearing the young. She creates a nest from plant fibers, animal hair and feathers in a shrub or a tree, approximately 1.2 to 4.2 m above ground. She will then incubate the clutch of two white eggs, each 8 by 13 mm. Incubation lasts 15 days followed by a 20–22 day nestling period. The chicks are altricial when they hatch and thus rely on their mother to feed and defend them. If successful, violet-bellied hummingbirds go on to live for approximately 4.2 years.

=== Food and feeding ===
Violet-bellied hummingbirds are primarily considered nectarivorous but may more accurately be called omnivorous. They consume nectar from plants in the Rubiaceae, Ericaceae, Gesneriaceae (Besleria), and Fabaceae (Inga) families. They also eat small arthropods, as do many other species of hummingbirds. Males may defend their feeding territory from other males and large insects. Although violet-bellied hummingbirds do not form flocks, they may congregate at fruit trees and feeders. The violet-bellied hummingbird's predators are not known.

=== Threats ===
According to their IUCN Red List conservation status of least concern, the violet-bellied hummingbird does not seem to be threatened. They are tolerant to disturbed areas such as forest edges.

== In culture ==
Tourists and locals alike may join in bird watching tours around Panama where the violet-bellied hummingbird is one of the featured birds.

== Status ==
The violet-bellied hummingbird is assessed as least concern by the IUCN Red List conservation status. Their population remains large and they have a wide distribution.
