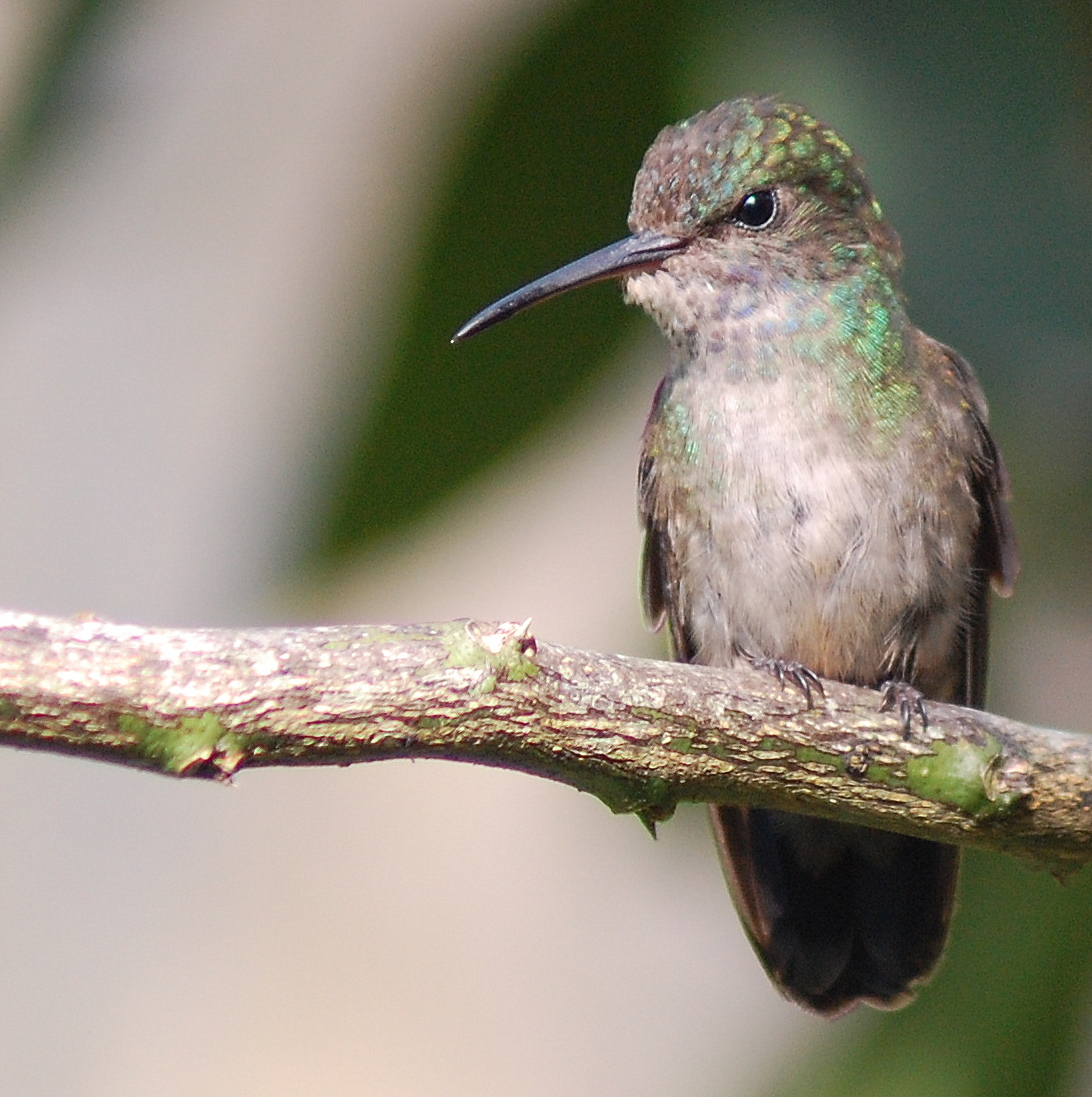

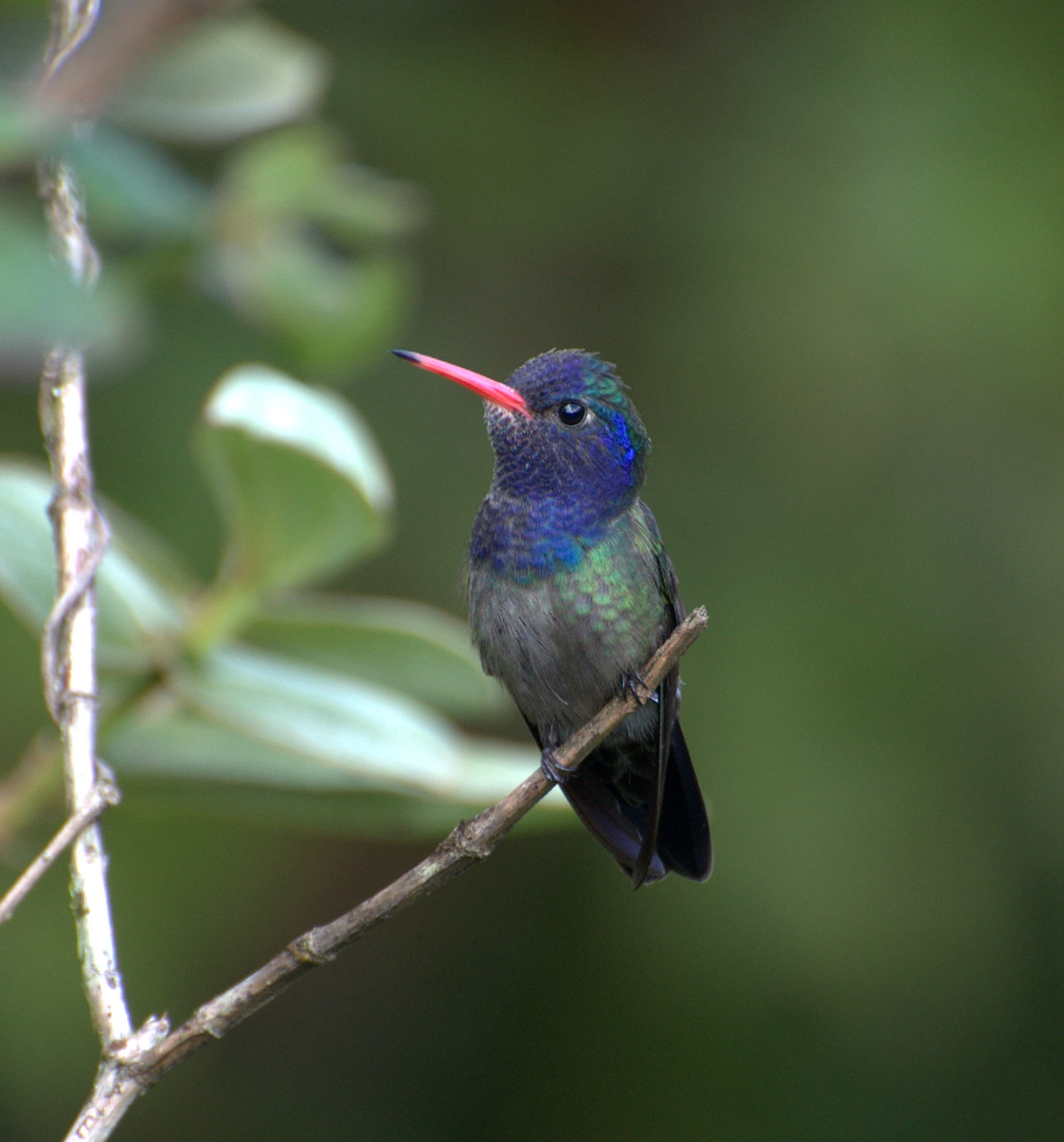
- Female (above) and male (below) in São Paulo, Brazil

Conservation status
- Least Concern (IUCN 3.1)
- CITES Appendix II

Scientific classification
- Kingdom: Animalia
- Phylum: Chordata
- Class: Aves
- Order: Apodiformes
- Family: Trochilidae
- Genus: Chlorestes
- Species: C. cyanus

Binomial name
- Chlorestes cyanus (Vieillot, 1818)

= White-chinned sapphire =

Species of bird

The White-chinned sapphire (Chlorestes cyanus) is a small species of hummingbird in the family Trochilidae. It is found in northern and eastern South America. It inhabits a variety of environments, including lowland tropical forests, woodland edges, and clearings with scattered trees. This species is known for its distinctive steel-blue tail and sexual dimorphism, with males displaying a violet-blue head and throat and a coral-red bill, while females have subdued green plumage. The White-chinned sapphire feeds primarily on nectar from flowering plants but also consumes small arthropods such as insects and spiders. It is non-migratory species and occurs as a year round resident throughout much of its range.

This species was formerly placed in the genus Hylocharis. A molecular phylogenetic study published in 2014 found that Hylocharis was polyphyletic. In the revised classification to create monophyletic genera, the white-chinned sapphire was moved to Chlorestes.

== Habitat ==
The white-chinned sapphire is a South American hummingbird, found across much of northern and eastern South America. Prior to 2007, this bird was widespread in the Amazon Rainforest at altitudes below 600m, extending north to the Amazon. Now, it is found in a variety of habitats including white sand forests, lowland evergreen forests, clearings with trees, and humid woodlands. The IUCN Red List identifies their habitat type as "Forest, Shrubland, Artificial/Terrestrial". They are not a migratory species, and remain as permanent residents of these various habitats year round. While they are found in various habitats, they are most commonly found in Sub-Tropical/Tropical moist lowlands such as the Amazon rainforest. Their current geographic range as of 2024 stretches across a large portion of South America, to include countries such as Argentina, Bolivia, Brazil, Colombia, Peru, and Venezuela.

== Description ==
The white-chinned Sapphire is a small hummingbird measuring 8–9 centimetres (3.1–3.5 in) in length and weighing approximately 2.8–3.5 grams (0.099–0.123 oz).The species exhibits marked sexual dimorphism. Adult males are readily identified by their bright coral-red bill with a dark tip, brilliant violet-blue head and throat, and small white chin patch, which may not always be conspicuous. The upper parts are golden green, becoming more copper toward the rump. The upper tail-coverts range from deep copper to purple tones. and the tail is steel blue to blue black. The belly and flanks are golden green, often becoming more grey toward the center; the female lacks the violet blue head and throat of the male and are more subdued in coloration. Their upper parts are lighter golden green with less contrast at the rump. The center of the underparts is grey, and the undertail-coverts are white. Both sexes have a distinctive stone-blue tail, which helps distinguish the species from similar hummingbirds such the Golden-tailed Sapphire (Chrysuronia oenone). The combination of the steel-blue tail and the male's coral-red bill provides a useful field mark for identification.

Juvenile males resemble females, but show partial blue-green coloration on the head and throat. Subspecific variation occurs across the species' range, with differences in bill length, belly coloration, and under tail-coverts noted among described races.

== Diet ==
The white-chinned sapphire primarily feeds on nectar. They receive nutrients from the nectar of a wide variety of flowers, including epiphytes, trees, and shrubs. They are most commonly found feeding on low to mid-level flowers in forest edges and gardens. They also feed on small beetles, flies, and spiders which are caught in flight or gleaned from vegetation. While they have been observed gathering at feeding trees with other hummingbirds, they are generally territorial of flowers.
