= Charles Henry Parry =

English physician & writer (1779–1860)

Charles Henry Parry (1779–1860) was an English physician and writer.

== Life ==
The eldest son of Caleb Hillier Parry, by his wife Sarah, a sister of Edward Rigby, he was born at Bath, Somerset. He studied medicine at the University of Göttingen and in 1799 was one of Samuel Taylor Coleridge's companions in the Harz; later he travelled in Scandinavia with Clement Carlyon. He graduated M.D. at Edinburgh on 24 June 1804.

Parry was admitted licentiate of the Royal College of Physicians on 22 December 1806, and elected Fellow of the Royal Society in 1812. He practised for some years at Bath, where he was physician to the General Hospital from 1818 to 1822. He retired early from practice, and settled at Brighton, where he died at his residence, 5 Belgrave Place, on 21 January 1860. His remains were interred at Weston, Bath.

== Works ==
Parry was author of:

- De Græcarum atque Romanarum Religionum ad Mores formandos Vi et Efficacia Commentatio, Göttingen, 1799.
- On Fever and its Treatment in General, translated from the German of Gottfried Christian Reich, 1801.
- Commentatio inauguralis de synocho tropico, vulgo febre flava dicta, Edinburgh, 1804.
- The Question of the Necessity of the existing Corn Laws, considered in their Relation to the Agricultural Labourer, the Tenantry, the Landholder, and the Country, Bath, 1816.
- Additional Experiments on the Arteries of warm-blooded Animals: with a brief examination of certain arguments which have been advanced against the doctrines maintained by the author of "An Experimental Enquiry", London, 1819; defence of his father Caleb Hillier Parry.
- Introductory Essays to Collections from the unpublished Medical Writings of the late Caleb Hillier Parry, M.D., London, 1825.
- Winchcombe: a poem, in Thomas Dudley Fosbroke's Picturesque and Topographical Account of Cheltenham and its Vicinity, Cheltenham, 1826.
- The Parliaments and Councils of England, chronologically arranged, from the reign of William I to the Revolution in 1688, London, 1839.
- A Memoir of the Rev. Joshua Parry: with some original essays and correspondence (posthumous, edited by Sir John Eardley-Wilmot, 2nd Baronet), London, 1872.

== Notes ==
Attribution

This article incorporates text from a publication now in the public domain: Lee, Sidney, ed. (1895). "Parry, Charles Henry". Dictionary of National Biography. Vol. 43. London: Smith, Elder & Co.
