= Winter Island (Kitikmeot) =

Island in the Kitikmeot Region, Nunavut, Canada

Winter
- Location within Nunavut Location within Canada

Geography
- Location: Northern Canada
- Coordinates: 67°43′N 102°15′W
- Archipelago: Arctic Archipelago

Administration
- Canada
- Territory: Nunavut
- Region: Kitikmeot

Demographics
- Population: 0

Winter Island is an uninhabited island of the Arctic Archipelago in the Kitikmeot Region, Nunavut. It is located at the mouth of the Perry River in the Queen Maud Gulf Migratory Bird Sanctuary where tundra swan have been known to nest in limited numbers. In 1822 William Parry, teamed up with two local Inuit to map places around the Melville Peninsula in the greater Canadian Arctic which included Winter Island.
