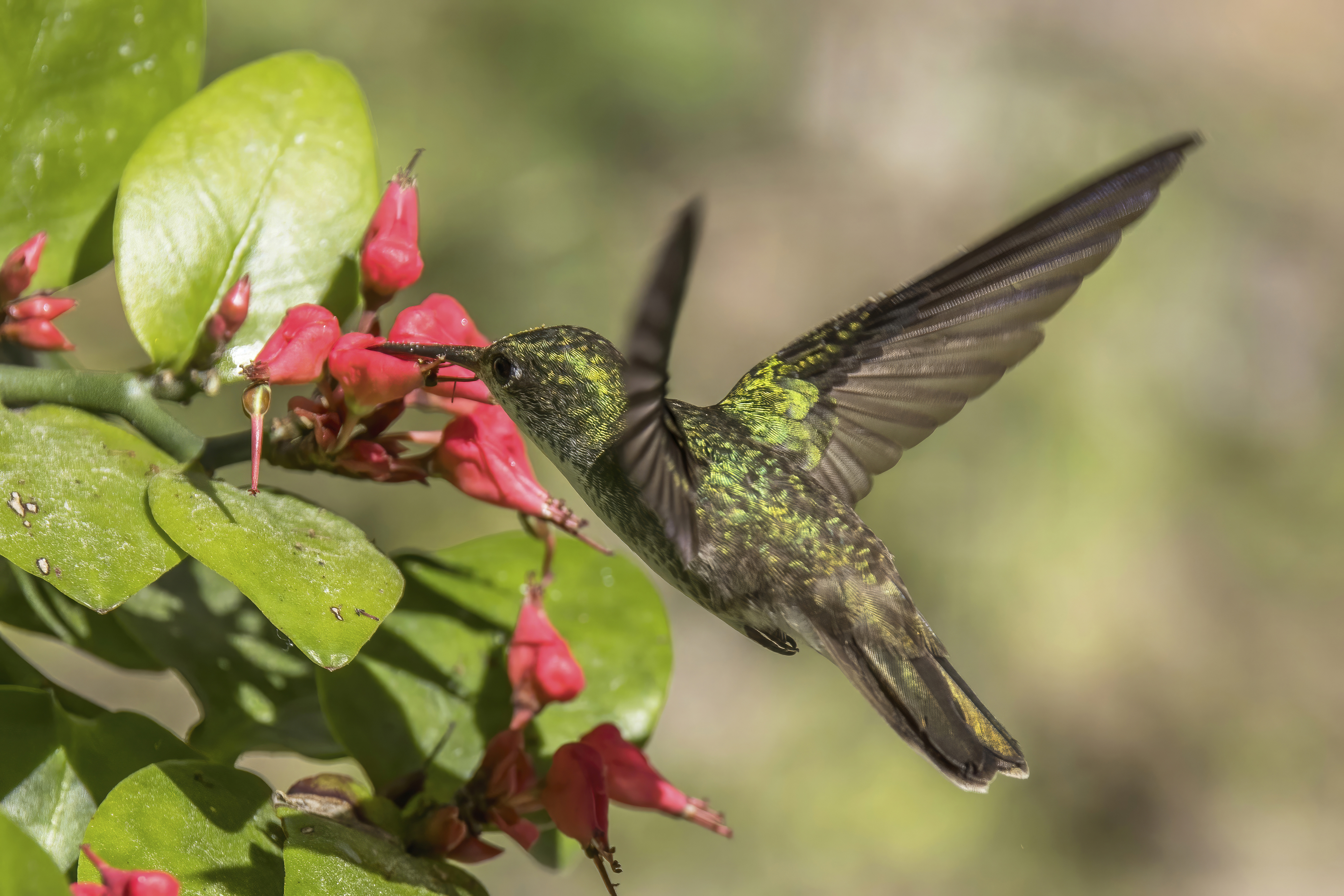
- In Guatemala
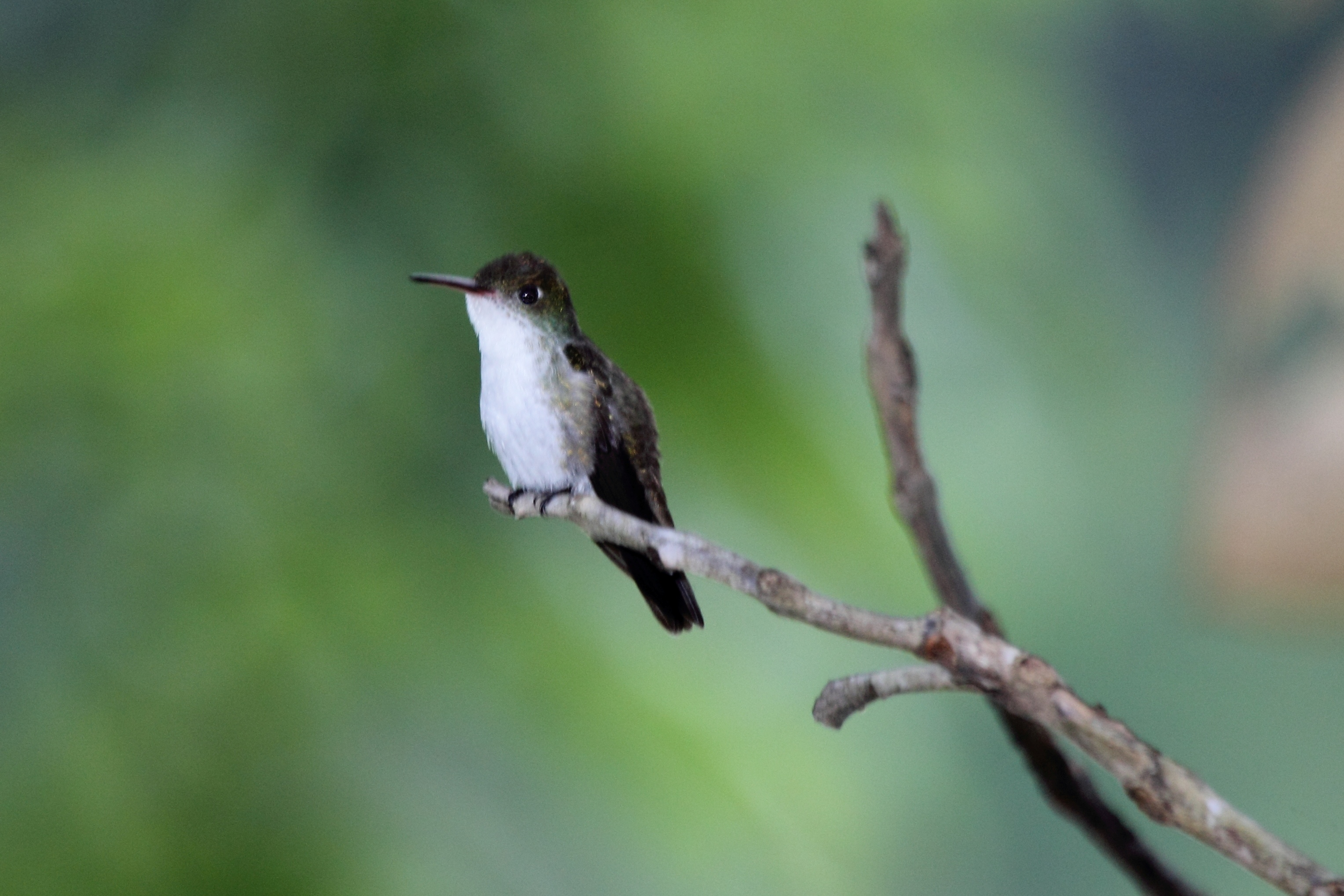
- In Belize

Conservation status
- Least Concern (IUCN 3.1)
- CITES Appendix II

Scientific classification
- Kingdom: Animalia
- Phylum: Chordata
- Class: Aves
- Order: Apodiformes
- Family: Trochilidae
- Genus: Chlorestes
- Species: C. candida

Binomial name
- Chlorestes candida (Bourcier & Mulsant, 1846)

Synonyms
- Amazilia candida

= White-bellied emerald =

Species of hummingbird

The white-bellied emerald (Chlorestes candida) is a species of hummingbird in the "emeralds", tribe Trochilini of subfamily Trochilinae. It is found in Belize, Guatemala, Honduras, Panama, Mexico, and Nicaragua.

== Taxonomy and systematics ==
The white-bellied emerald was originally placed in genus Amazilia. A molecular phylogenetic study published in 2014 found that Amazilia was polyphyletic. In 2020 the North American Classification Committee of the American Ornithological Society (AOS) and the International Ornithological Committee (IOC) moved it and four other hummingbirds into genus Chlorestes. In 2021 the Clements taxonomy followed suit. However, the 2020 Version 5 of BirdLife International's Handbook of the Birds of the World retains it in Amazilia.

The white-bellied emerald has three recognized subspecies, the nominate C. c. candida, C. c. genini, and C. c. pacifica.

== Description ==
The nominate subspecies of white-bellied emerald is 8 to 11 cm (3.1 to 4.3 in) long and weighs 2.9 to 4.3 g (0.10 to 0.15 oz). Adults' upperparts are metallic bronze to bronzy green, with the back usually greener than the crown and neck. The underparts are white with metallic bronzy green from the cheeks to the flanks. The tail is metallic bronze; all but the central pair of feathers have a broad purplish bronze or blackish band near the end, and the outermost two pairs also have dull brownish gray tips. Immatures are similar to adults but the feathers of the crown, rump, and uppertail coverts have brownish tips.

C. c. genini differs from the nominate only in having a longer and broader bill. The bill of C. c. pacifica is also heavier and stouter than that of the nominate, and the green of its back extends further onto the sides and flanks.

== Distribution and habitat ==
The nominate subspecies of white-bellied emerald is found on the Caribbean slope from the Mexican states of Chiapas, Tabasco, and Yucatán south through Belize, Guatemala, and Honduras into Nicaragua. C. c. genini is found in southeastern Mexico north of the nominate between San Luis Potosi and northern Oaxaca. C. c. pacifica is found in extreme southern Chiapas on the Pacific slope of Mexico and disjuctly in Guatemala. Specimens were collected in Costa Rica in the late 19th and early 20th centuries but there are no recent records there.

The white-bellied emerald inhabits the interior and edges of lowland evergreen and semi-deciduous forest. In elevation it ranges from sea level to 1,600 m (5,200 ft).

== Behavior ==
=== Movement ===
The white-bellied emerald is resident in most of its range. Local populations make some seasonal movements.

=== Feeding ===
The white-bellied emerald often feeds low to the ground but regularly forages at all levels up into the canopy. Its principal diet is nectar taken from a wide variety of flowering plants, and it also seeks insect prey in foliage. It is dominated by the larger rufous-tailed hummingbird (Amazilia tzacati). However, in 2019 a pair of researchers documented a female white-bellied emerald feeding a juvenile rufous-tailed hummingbird.

=== Breeding ===
The male white-bellied emerald sings in leks and so is believed to be polygynous. The species' breeding season spans from February to May. Females build a cup nest on a horizontal branch, using plant material and cobweb decorated on the outside with lichen and moss. The clutch size is two eggs.

=== Vocalization ===
The white-bellied emerald's song is a "varied, high, thin, slightly shrill chipping, tsi'si-sit' tsi-tsin', also described as "a monotonous, high, squeaky tssi-ip tssi-ip ... or tsip tsip ... etc." Its calls are "mostly rolled or trilled chips, trirr and ti-ti or tsi-tsir, and longer drii-i-i-it and tsi si-si-si-sit, etc."

== Status ==
The IUCN has assessed the white-bellied emerals as being of Least Concern. It has a large range, but its population size is unknown and believed to be decreasing due to habitat destruction.
