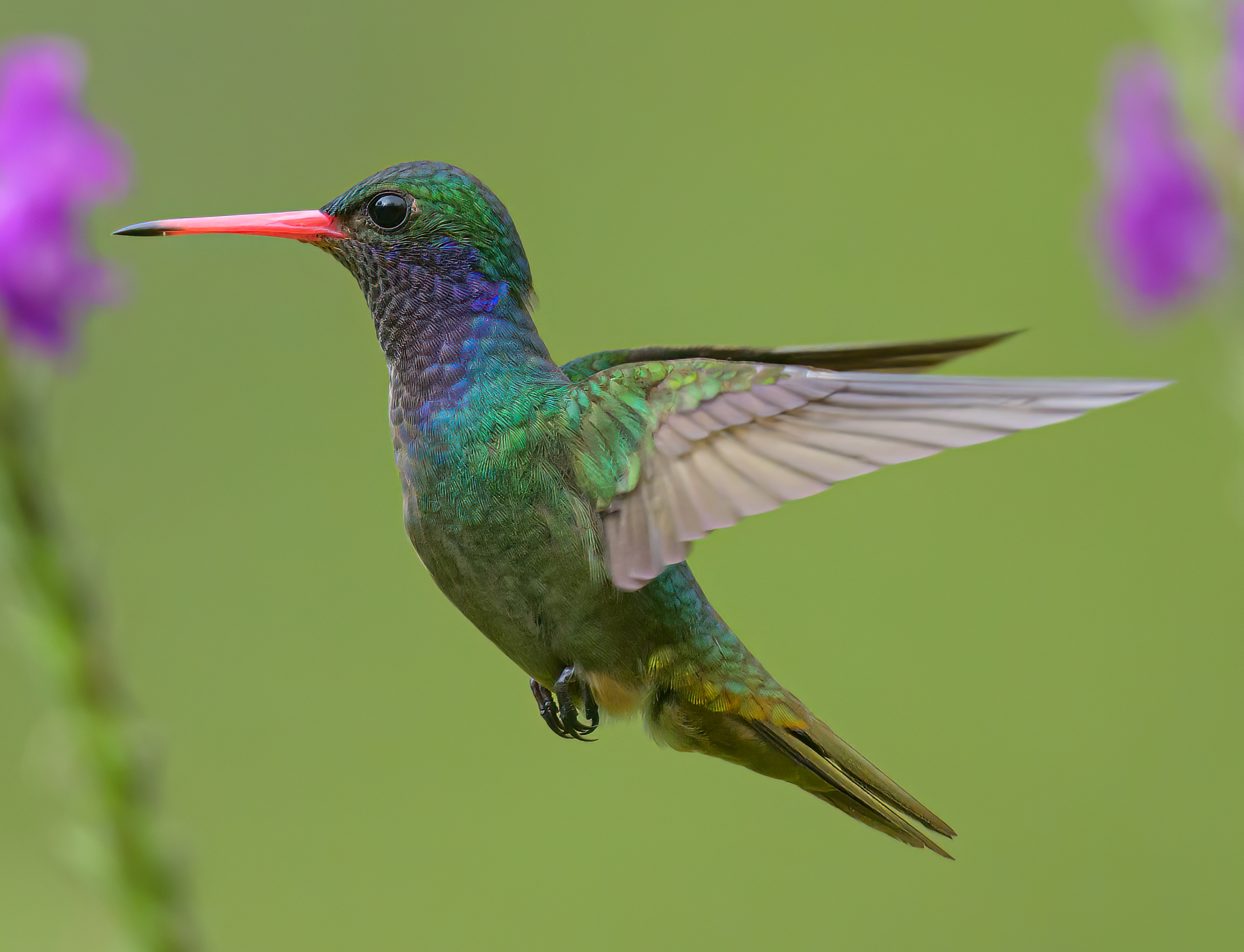
- At Arenal Observatory Lodge, Costa Rica

Conservation status
- Least Concern (IUCN 3.1)
- CITES Appendix II

Scientific classification
- Kingdom: Animalia
- Phylum: Chordata
- Class: Aves
- Order: Apodiformes
- Family: Trochilidae
- Genus: Chlorestes
- Species: C. eliciae

Binomial name
- Chlorestes eliciae (Bourcier & Mulsant, 1846)
- Range of H. eliciae

= Blue-throated goldentail =

Species of bird

The blue-throated goldentail (Chlorestes eliciae), also known as the blue-throated sapphire, is a species of hummingbird in the family Trochilidae. It is found in Belize, Colombia, Costa Rica, El Salvador, Guatemala, Honduras, Mexico, Nicaragua, and Panama. Its natural habitats are subtropical or tropical moist lowland forest and heavily degraded former forest.

The male blue-throated goldentail is a little bit larger than the female and display similar patterns but brighter colors on its plumage. This species can be distinguished by its straight, bright red bill with a black tip. The crown and upperparts of the male blue-throated goldentail are green, and more coppery or golden on the rectrices. The throat is glittering blue-violet to violet, the belly is cream-brown buff, and the sides of the breast and the flanks are streaked with green. The female's throat is rather violet blue, mixed with gray buff, and the belly is paler than the male's. The immature looks like the female adult as it has duller colors. This characteristic more pronounced in the female juvenile.

As most hummingbird species, the blue-throated goldentail is primarily nectarivorous. It feeds on flowers of shrubs (Stachytarpheta, Hamelia) and large herbs (Heliconia, Renealmia, Thalea), on epiphytes, and sometimes on small arthropods.

== Taxonomy ==
The blue-throated goldentail was first described by Bourcier and Mulsant in 1846. Two subspecies are now recognized:

- Chlorestes eliciae eliciae, described as Trochilus Eliciae (Bourcier and Mulsant 1846). It occurs from southern Mexico to Costa Rica.
- Chlorestes eliciae earina, described as Hylocharis eliciae earinaWetmore 1967. It occurs in Panama and Colombia. It is similar to the nominate eliciae, but "definitely darker above, being dark metallic green, with crown and back nearly uniform; coppery brown of upper tail coverts and lower rump slightly darker; this color less extensive on upper rump; tail duller metallic bronze-green" (Wetmore 1967: 233).

The blue-throated goldentail was formerly placed in the genus Hylocharis. A molecular phylogenetic study published in 2014 found that Hylocharis was polyphyletic. In the revised classification to create monophyletic genera, this hummingbird was moved to Chlorestes.

== Description ==
This medium-sized hummingbird measures 9 cm (3.5 in) and weighs 3.6 g (0.13 oz). On average, the male's wings measure 49.7 mm (1.96 in), its tail 26.7 mm (1.05 in), and its bill (i.e. culmen from base) 18.2 mm (0.72 in). The female's parts are a little bit smaller, as its wings measure 47.7 mm (1.88 in), its tail 25.9 mm (1.02 in), and its bill 19.4 mm (0.76 in). The crown and upperparts are green, shading to the metallic golden-green tail. The wings are dusky, while the sides and belly are green. The throat is metallic blue-violet. The bill is straight, coral red with a black tip, and broad at the base. The female is paler overall, with more black on the bill and more grey on the throat, but still bears bright golden-green upper tail coverts. Both males and females' irises and toes are dark brown.

After hatching, the juvenile completes its preformative plumage between March and August, and finish developing its definitive prebasic plumage at the same period (i.e. March–August) of the following year. During its first year after hatch, the female juvenile's plumage changes. The blackish culmen fades away into a more dusky one with some red wash on 50% of the basal, the throat's initial greenish-blue spotting turn into more extensive dark-blue spotting, and the outer rectrices display cinnamon tips that then vanish as the female's plumage alters. As a contrast, the male juvenile's culmen evolves from dusky with some red coloration to more bright red coloration on 75% of the basal, its throat's dark-blue spotting become larger, and its feathers' gray edges fade away. Male juveniles do not bear any cinnamon tips like some female juveniles do, but their black bill contrasts distinctly more with their bright red basal than female juveniles' dusky basal.

This hummingbird species can sometimes be confused with other species such as rufous-tailed hummingbird, but the rufous-tailed hummingbird is larger, has a longer, rufous tail, green throat and breast as opposed to blue in the blue-throated goldentail, and a more curved and paler bill. Blue-throated goldentail also resembles Blue-headed sapphire but the latter differs from it by its blue crown and sides of the head, green throat and blue tail. These two species' range overlap in extreme eastern Panama and northwestern Colombia, but there is no evidence of sympatry between them.

The male blue-throated goldentail sings in leks and has a vocal song that greatly varies between different leks, and, less commonly, within a lek. The song "typically [is] a phrase of 5-8 notes, the first a piercing tseee, followed by a series of single or double notes, or short trills; a male usually gives 1-3 such phrases, pauses, then repeats: seee; sa se sa se sase; tseet twosip twosip twosip; or zeee wrrr zewet zewet zewet, etc." Blue-throated goldentail's call is described as "a high, buzzy tzip or tzet; aggressive note a sharp, liquid, descending twitter". Nonvocal sound has not been documented, except for the "whirring" or "humming" sound generated by the wings' flapping.

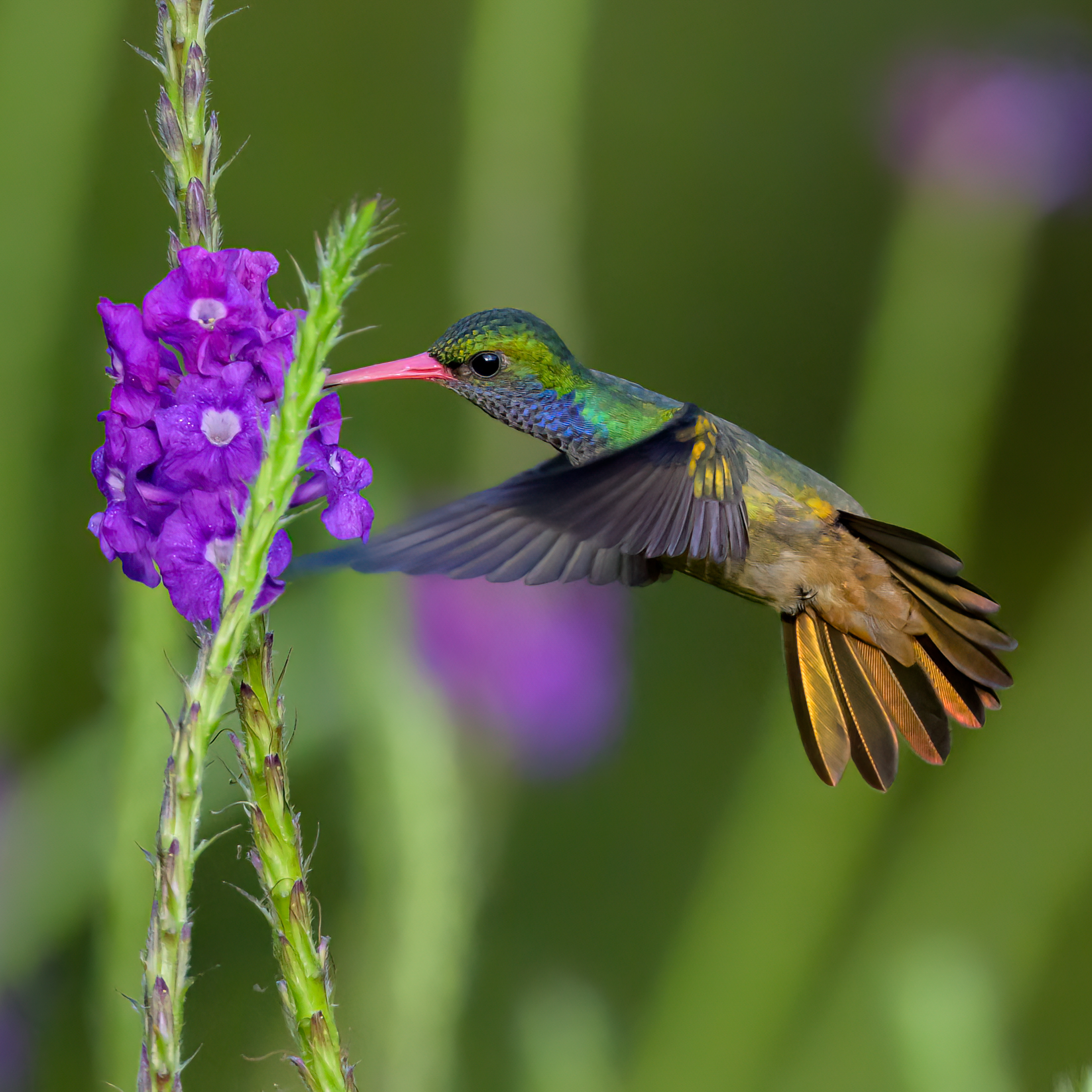
Blue-throated Goldentail in flight, at Arenal Observatory Lodge, Costa Rica.

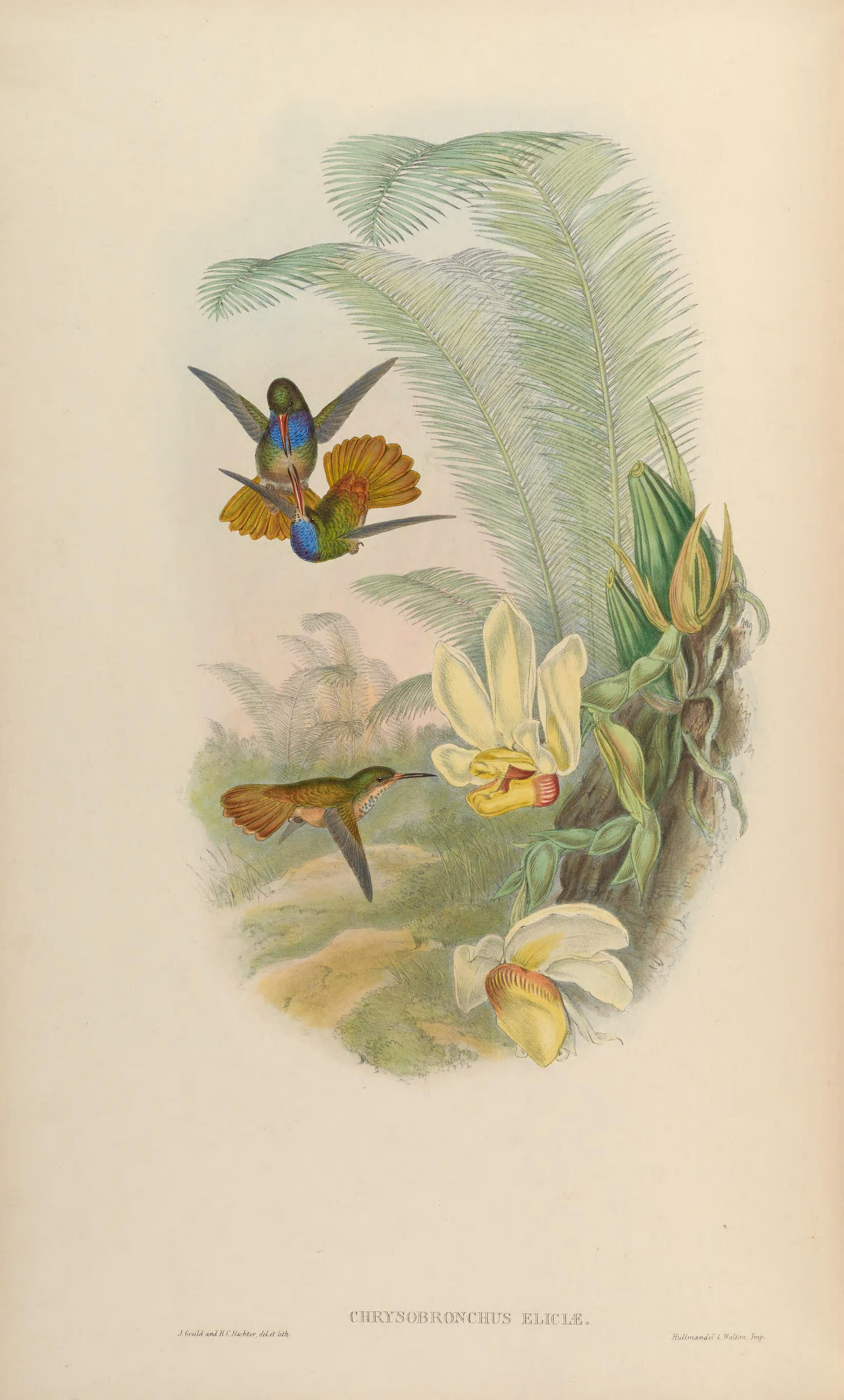
Monograph

== Distribution and habitat ==
The blue-throated goldentail is endemic to the Americas. Its range extends from southern Mexico to western Panama along both slopes, with a few occurrences in northern Chocó in Colombia. The Blue-throated goldentail occupies lowlands and valleys, and its elevational range varies between 950 m. a.s.l. in Costa Rica and 1000 m. a.s.l. in Mexico. Yet, some specimens have been recorded up to 2000 m a.s.l in the Braulio National Park in Costa Rica, as well as in El Salvador. Though its seasonal movements are poorly documented, the blue-throated goldentail is considered resident throughout most of its range and is relatively sedentary but it may display local wandering during flowering. Some studies suggest that these unusual records at high elevations could be an effect of climate change, as bird species occupying high elevations have been shown to be declining in abundance, while other bird species occurring in lower elevations have started to move upwards.

The species' natural habitats are humid to semihumid forest, second-growth forest, plantations, semi-open, light woodland, gardens and gallery forest in drier regions.

== Behavior ==
=== Diet ===
The blue-throated goldentail is mainly nectarivorous. Its diet comprises flowers of Stachytarpheta, Hamelia, Heliconia, Renealmia, Thalea, Inga, Psidium, Lobelia, and some epiphytes. The blue-throated goldentail also consume small arthropods in small proportions. More research needs to be done on the details of its diet, as well as on its foraging behavior.

=== Breeding ===
There is little information about blue-throated goldentail's breeding biology, but it is suspected to reproduce during the dry season between December and July. Blue-throated goldentail build cup-shaped nests with plant material and spider web at "2-4m height in small branches on the forest edges, secondary vegetation and gardens". Females usually lay 2 eggs.

=== Conservation and status ===
Blue-throated goldentail's populations occupy a vast range and seem to be increasing. They are thus not considered to be Vulnerable under the range size and population trend criterion and are evaluated as of Least Concern. This means that the species is not threatened.
