= Joshua Parry =

Welsh Nonconformist minister and writer

Joshua Parry (17 June 1719 – 6 September 1776) was a Welsh Nonconformist minister and writer.

== Life ==
Parry was born at Llangan, Pembrokeshire, on 17 June 1719 (O.S.); his parents died in his infancy. He was first taught by a private tutor at Haverfordwest, and then was a pupil of John Eames at the Fund Academy, Moorfields, where John Canton and John Hawkesworth were also students.

In 1738 Parry went to live with John Ryland in Moorfields. In 1741 he was acting as minister at Midhurst, Sussex, and on 3 March 1742 took up residence at Cirencester as minister of the Presbyterian church founded by Alexander Gregory in 1662. Here Parry formed a lifelong friendship with Allen Bathurst, 1st Earl Bathurst; Parry preached the sermon on Bathurst's death in September 1765, and wrote the article on him for Biographia Britannica.

Parry declined in 1748 an invitation to succeed Edmund Calamy at Crosby Square, London, and in 1757 and 1766 invitations to become assistant, and afterwards successor, to Samuel Chandler, of the Old Jewry dissenting church. He remained at Cirencester until his death, on 6 September 1766. He was buried in the ground attached to his chapel, where a plain stone without inscription marked his grave.

== Works ==
From 1738 or thereabouts Parry contributed to the newly founded Gentleman's Magazine. His work remained on the small scale, and he published mostly anonymously or pseudonymously. He was author of:

- Political Essays and Satires, some of them signed "Philopatria";
- Evidences of Christianity, 1742;
- Erastes, an Ethic Poem in defence of Love; with Advice to Lovers, a Fragment, 1749;
- An Answer to Hervey's Theron and Aspasio, 1757;
- A Confession of Faith, 1757 (printed in the Memoir);
- A Poem to the Memory of Major-General James Wolfe, 1759.
- Seventeen Sermons on Practical Subjects published posthumously, Bath and London, 1783.

Among essays appended to Charles Henry Parry, A Memoir of the Reverend Joshua Parry (1872) are: Natural Theology: a Free Discourse on the Being and Attributes of the Deity; On the Moral Sense; A Short Defence of Christianity (written 1743); A Satire on King George the Second, in a Letter to His Majesty [1746], directed against that Party Spirit which sees no Good in the existing Order of Things, and discovers in the best Intentions the most obnoxious Purposes.

== Family ==
Parry married, in 1752, Sarah, daughter of Caleb Hillier of Upcott, Devonshire, and Withington, Gloucestershire, who, with two sons and two daughters, survived him. She died in 1786. His eldest son was Caleb Hillier Parry; his daughter Amelia married Sir Benjamin Hobhouse.

== Notes ==
Attribution

This article incorporates text from a publication now in the public domain: Lee, Sidney, ed. (1895). "Parry, Joshua". Dictionary of National Biography. Vol. 43. London: Smith, Elder & Co.
