= Winter Island (Qikiqtaaluk) =

Island in the Qikiqtaaluk Region, Nunavut, Canada

Winter
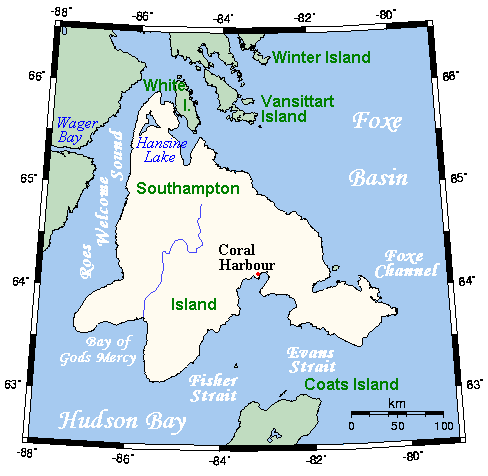
- A closeup map showing Winter Island

- Location within Nunavut Location within Canada

Geography
- Location: Northern Canada
- Coordinates: 66°16′N 083°04′W
- Archipelago: Arctic Archipelago

Administration
- Canada
- Territory: Nunavut
- Region: Qikiqtaaluk

Demographics
- Population: 0

Winter Island is an uninhabited island of the Arctic Archipelago in the Qikiqtaaluk Region, Nunavut. It lies in the Foxe Basin with Hoppner Strait to the northwest. Winter Island is south of the Melville Peninsula, separated from it by Lyon Inlet. William Edward Parry wintered here at the end of 1821.
