= Edward Rigby (physician) =

English physician, writer and local politician

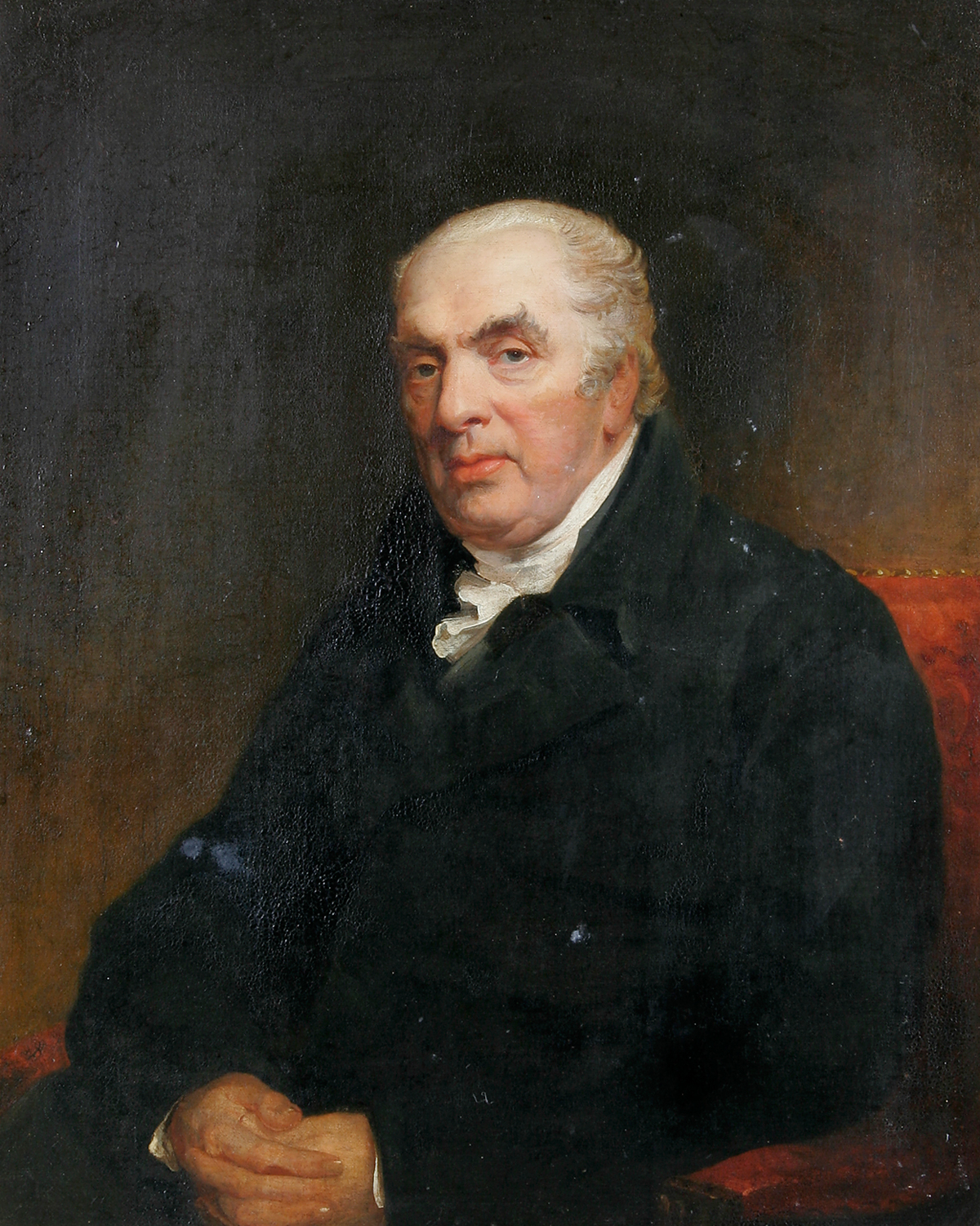
- Born: 27 December 1747; Chowbent, England
- Died: 27 October 1821 (aged 73)
- Education: Warrington Academy
- Occupation: physician
- Political party: Whig

Edward Rigby (27 December 1747 – 27 October 1821) was an English physician, writer, and local politician.

== Life ==
The son of John Rigby, by his wife Sarah (d. 1773), daughter of John Taylor, he was born at Chowbent, Lancashire, on 27 December 1747. One of his sisters married Dr. Caleb Hillier Parry, and became the mother of Sir William Edward Parry. Educated at Norwich School and Warrington Academy, Rigby was apprenticed in 1762 to David Martineau (1726–1768), surgeon, of Norwich. He then studied in London. Admitted a member of the Corporation of Surgeons on 4 May 1769, he married in the same year, and settled in Norwich.

In 1786 Rigby took the lead in establishing the Norfolk Benevolent Society for the relief of the widows and orphans of medical men. In July 1789 he visited France and other parts of the continent, witnessing the storming of the Bastille. A practical agriculturist, he was the friend of Thomas Coke, 1st Earl of Leicester of Holkham. Rigby experimented on his own farm at Framingham Earl, about five miles from Norwich.

In 1783 Rigby became a member of the corporation of guardians of Norwich, and promoted the economical administration of the Poor Laws. Meeting with much opposition, he resigned in the following year. He became alderman in 1802 in a very tight contest for the North Ward, sheriff in 1803, and mayor of Norwich in 1805, presiding over a meeting addressing the issue of smallpox in the city. Rigby is said to have made known the flying shuttle to Norwich manufacturers, and to have introduced vaccination.

In politics Rigby was a Whig, and a supporter of William Windham. In 1794, however, when Windham became Secretary at War and had to stand again for Norwich, Rigby was one of the disillusioned Whigs who backed James Mingay against him, and proposed the candidate. Windham was elected, but Mingay's reputation as a Whig was boosted.

Rigby died on 27 October 1821, and was buried at Framingham.

== Works ==
In 1776 Rigby published An Essay on the Uterine Hæmorrhage which precedes the Delivery of the full-grown Fœtus (3rd edit. 1784; 6th edit., with a memoir by John Cross, Norwich, 1822). This work was translated into French, by Marie-Anne-Victoire Gallain Boivin (1818), and German, and made Rigby's professional reputation. He wrote also:

- An Essay on the Theory and Production of Animal Heat, and on its Application in the Treatment of Cutaneous Eruptions, Inflammations, and some other Diseases, London, 1785.
- Chemical Observations on Sugar, London, 1788.
- An Essay on the use of the Red Peruvian Bark in the Cure of Intermittents, London, 1783.
- Reports of the Special Provision Committee, appointed by the Court of Guardians, in … Norwich, 1788.
- Further Facts relating to the Care of the Poor and the Management of the Workhouse in the City of Norwich, a sequel.
- Holkham, its Agriculture, etc., Pamphleteer, 1813, vol. xiii.; 2nd edit. with ... additions, Norwich, 1817; 3rd edit. ... enlarged, Norwich, 1818. Another edit. 1819.
- Report of the Norwich Pauper Vaccination, from 10 Aug. 1812 to 10 Aug. 1813, London, 1813.
- Suggestions for an Improved and Extended Cultivation of Mangel Wurzel, Norwich 1815.
- Italy: its Agriculture … from the French of Châteauvieux, 1819.
- Framingham: its Agriculture, &c., including the Economy of a small Farm, Norwich, 1820.

His Letters from France, addressed to his wife in 1789, were first published by his daughter Lady Eastlake, London, 1880.

== Family ==
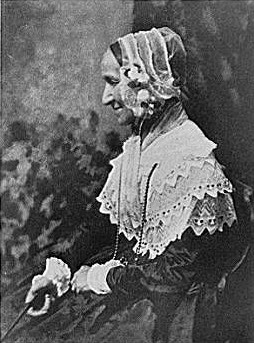
Rigby's second wife, Anne, photograph

Rigby married, first, Sarah, coheir of John Dybal, by whom he left two daughters, and secondly, in 1803, Anne Palgrave, daughter of William Palgrave of Great Yarmouth, by whom he had twelve children, four of whom, three girls and a boy, were the production of one birth on 15 August 1817. Edward Rigby (1804–1860) and Elizabeth Eastlake were among them.
