= Gottfried Christian Reich =

German physician and professor of medicine

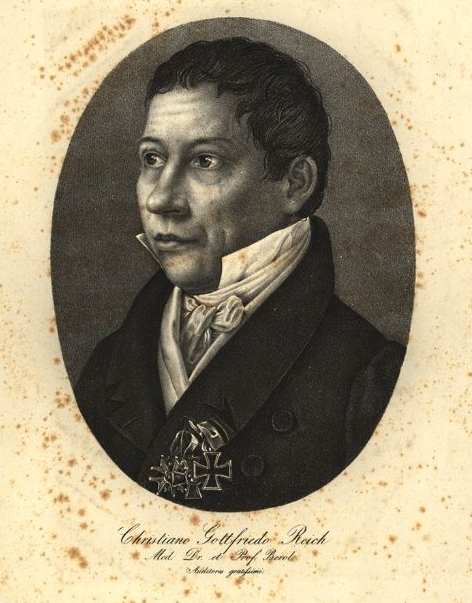
A lithograph made between 1809 and 1848

Gottfried Christian Reich (19 July 1769 – 5 January 1848) was a German medical doctor and a professor of medicine first at the University of Erlangen and then at Berlin University. He translated several medical works in English to German. He also took an interest in natural history and edited two short-lived periodicals, one on the animal kingdom and another on plants.

== Life and work ==
Reich was born in the Kaiserhammer hunting lodge at Marktleuthen near Wunsiedel. He studied medicine at Jena and Erlangen and received a doctorate in 1793 for a thesis titled Brevis epidemiae variolosae Arzbergensis anni 1791 delineatio. He then became a professor of medicine at the University of Erlangen. He translated several medical works from English to German and in 1796 he wrote on rinderpest. He also edited periodicals on plants and animals, describing two new insects and a hummingbird species. He also wrote on fevers and suggested that they were due to chemical causes, specifically an increase in nitrogen and a reduction in oxygen, suggesting the treatment using acids. He claimed that the results were infallible and news of his claim spread widely. The Prussian government requested him to conduct some experiments to demonstrate this at the Charité hospital in Berlin in 1799. The results were published in 1801 and was reviewed favourably, and he was granted a pension. He also gave lectures and moved to Berlin in 1800. He was posted as professor of medicine when Berlin University was founded and he worked there until his death.
