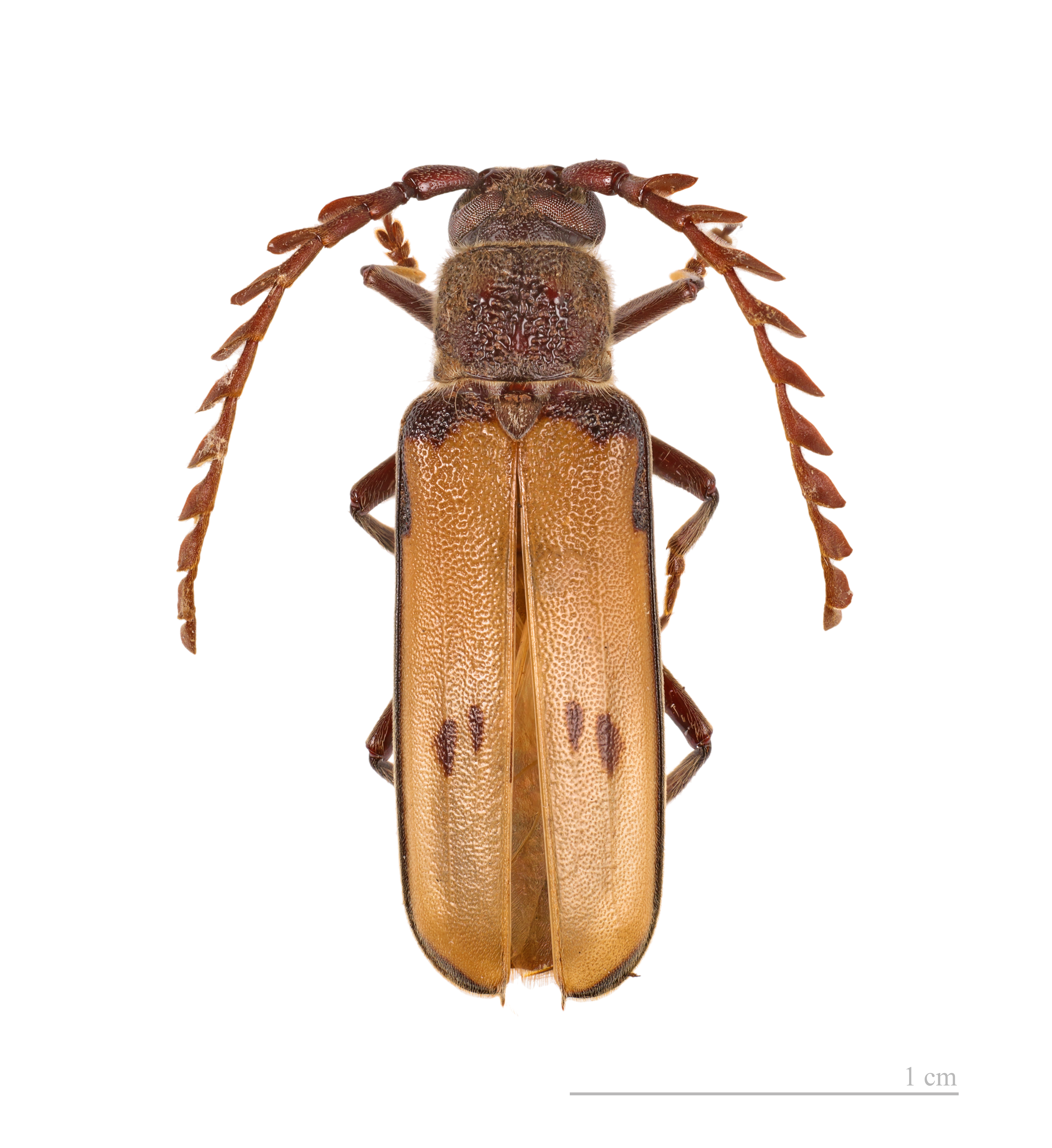
- Gigantotrichoderes conicicollis

Scientific classification
- Domain: Eukaryota
- Kingdom: Animalia
- Phylum: Arthropoda
- Class: Insecta
- Order: Coleoptera
- Suborder: Polyphaga
- Infraorder: Cucujiformia
- Family: Cerambycidae
- Subfamily: Cerambycinae
- Tribe: Torneutini

= Torneutini =

Tribe of beetles

Torneutini is a tribe of beetles in the subfamily Cerambycinae, containing the following genera:

- Coccoderus
- Diploschema
- Dragomiris
- Dragoneutes
- Gigantotrichoderes
- Gnathopraxithea
- Lophoschema
- Macellidiopygus
- Praxithea
- Psygmatocerus
- Spathopygus
- Thaumasus
- Torneucerus
- Torneutes
- Torneutopsis
- Xenambyx
