= Praxithea lanei =

Scientific classification
- Kingdom: Animalia
- Phylum: Arthropoda
- Class: Insecta
- Order: Coleoptera
- Suborder: Polyphaga
- Infraorder: Cucujiformia
- Family: Cerambycidae
- Genus: Praxithea
- Species: P. lanei

Binomial name
- Praxithea lanei Joly, 1999

Species of beetle

Praxithea lanei is a species of longhorn beetle in the family Cerambycidae, subfamily Cerambycinae, and tribe Torneutini. It was described by Joly in 1999. It is found in Brazil and Venezuela.

== Taxonomy ==
The genus Praxithea belongs to the tribe Torneutini, a group of Neotropical longhorn beetles within the supertribe Trachyderoinia. A cladistic analysis based on morphological characters found Praxithea to be the sister group of Gnathopraxithea within Torneutini. The closely related P. derourei (Chabrillac, 1857) has been more extensively studied, with documented host plant associations and life history information.

== Description ==
Like other members of Cerambycidae, P. lanei is characterised by elongate antennae that are typically as long as or longer than the body. Torneutini beetles are generally robust-bodied cerambycines found exclusively in the Neotropical realm.

== Biology ==
The larvae of Praxithea species are xylophagous, developing in the tissues of woody plants. Cerambycid larvae, known as roundheaded borers, typically feed on the wood, bark, or pith of their host plants, and most species in the family complete their development over one to three years. The biology of P. lanei specifically has not been extensively studied, though P. derourei has been documented as a wood borer associated with several tree species in South America.

== Distribution ==
Praxithea lanei is found in Brazil and Venezuela. The genus Praxithea as a whole is distributed across the Neotropical realm, with species recorded from South America and Central America.
