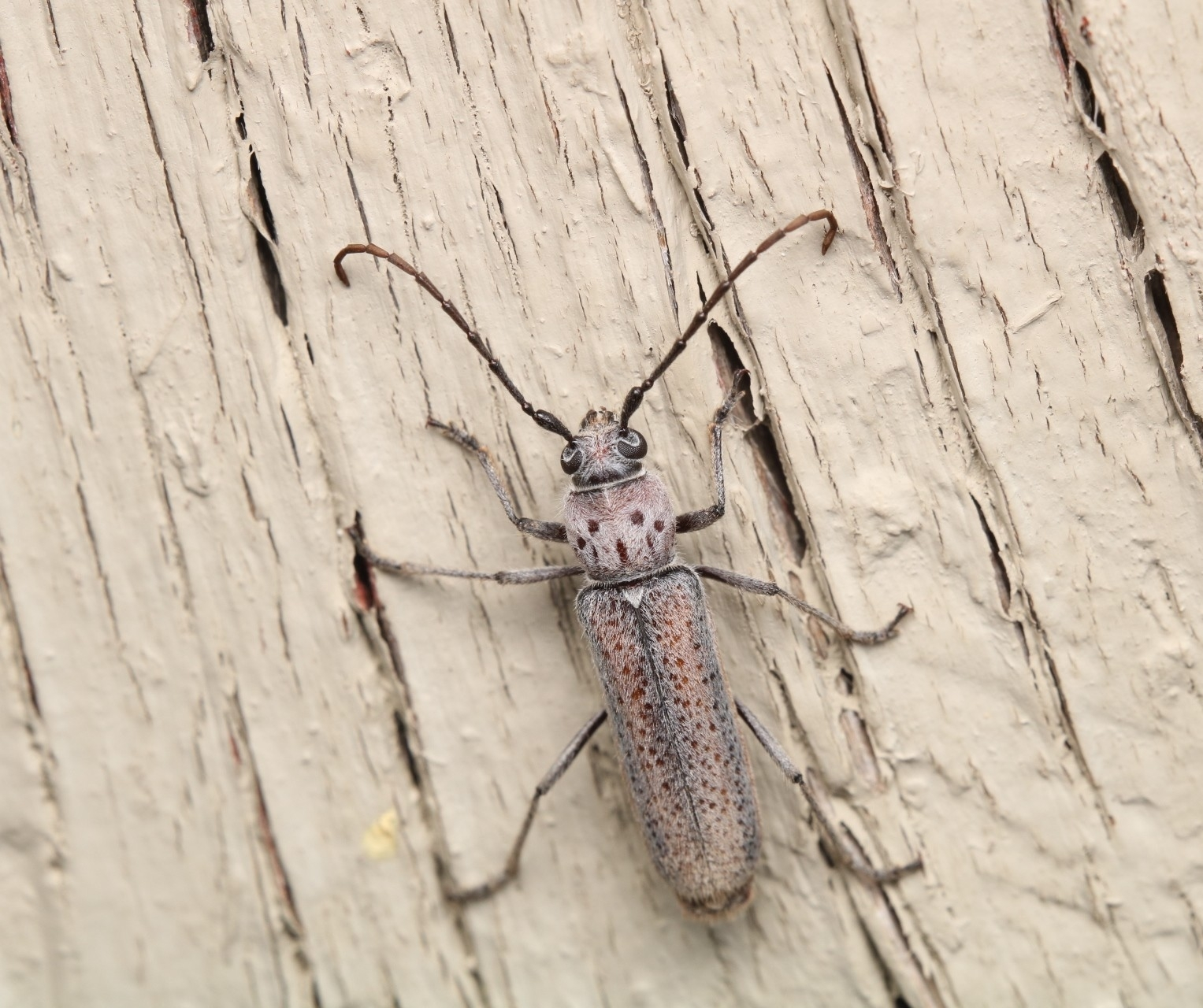
- Chrotoma dunniana, Big Bend National Park, Texas

Scientific classification
- Kingdom: Animalia
- Phylum: Arthropoda
- Class: Insecta
- Order: Coleoptera
- Suborder: Polyphaga
- Infraorder: Cucujiformia
- Family: Cerambycidae
- Tribe: Torneutini
- Subtribe: Torneutina
- Genus: Chrotoma; Casey, 1891
- Species: C. dunniana

Binomial name
- Chrotoma dunniana Casey, 1891

= Chrotoma =

Genus of beetle

Chrotoma is a genus of long-horned beetles in the family Cerambycidae. There is a single species in Chrotoma, C. dunniana, found in the southwest United States and northern Mexico.
