= Praxithea fabricii =

Scientific classification
- Domain: Eukaryota
- Kingdom: Animalia
- Phylum: Arthropoda
- Class: Insecta
- Order: Coleoptera
- Suborder: Polyphaga
- Infraorder: Cucujiformia
- Family: Cerambycidae
- Genus: Praxithea
- Species: P. fabricii

Binomial name
- Praxithea fabricii (Audinet-Serville, 1834)

Species of beetle

Praxithea fabricii is a species of beetle in the family Cerambycidae. It was described by Audinet-Serville in 1834.
