= Thaumasus =

Scientific classification
- Kingdom: Animalia
- Phylum: Arthropoda
- Class: Insecta
- Order: Coleoptera
- Suborder: Polyphaga
- Infraorder: Cucujiformia
- Family: Cerambycidae
- Tribe: Torneutini
- Genus: Thaumasus; Reiche, 1853
- Species: T. gigas

Binomial name
- Thaumasus gigas (Olivier, 1793)

Genus of beetles

Thaumasus is a genus of typical longhorn beetles in the family Cerambycidae. This genus has a single species, Thaumasus gigas, found in Central and South America.
