= Gigantotrichoderes flabellicornis =

Scientific classification
- Kingdom: Animalia
- Phylum: Arthropoda
- Class: Insecta
- Order: Coleoptera
- Suborder: Polyphaga
- Infraorder: Cucujiformia
- Family: Cerambycidae
- Genus: Gigantotrichoderes
- Species: G. flabellicornis

Binomial name
- Gigantotrichoderes flabellicornis (Zajciw, 1965)

Species of beetle

Gigantotrichoderes flabellicornis is a species of beetle in the family Cerambycidae. It was described by Zajciw in 1965.
