= Coccoderus guianensis =

Scientific classification
- Kingdom: Animalia
- Phylum: Arthropoda
- Class: Insecta
- Order: Coleoptera
- Suborder: Polyphaga
- Infraorder: Cucujiformia
- Family: Cerambycidae
- Genus: Coccoderus
- Species: C. guianensis

Binomial name
- Coccoderus guianensis Tavakilian & Monné, 2002

Species of beetle

Coccoderus guianensis is a species of beetle in the family Cerambycidae. It was described by Tavakilian and Monné in 2002.
