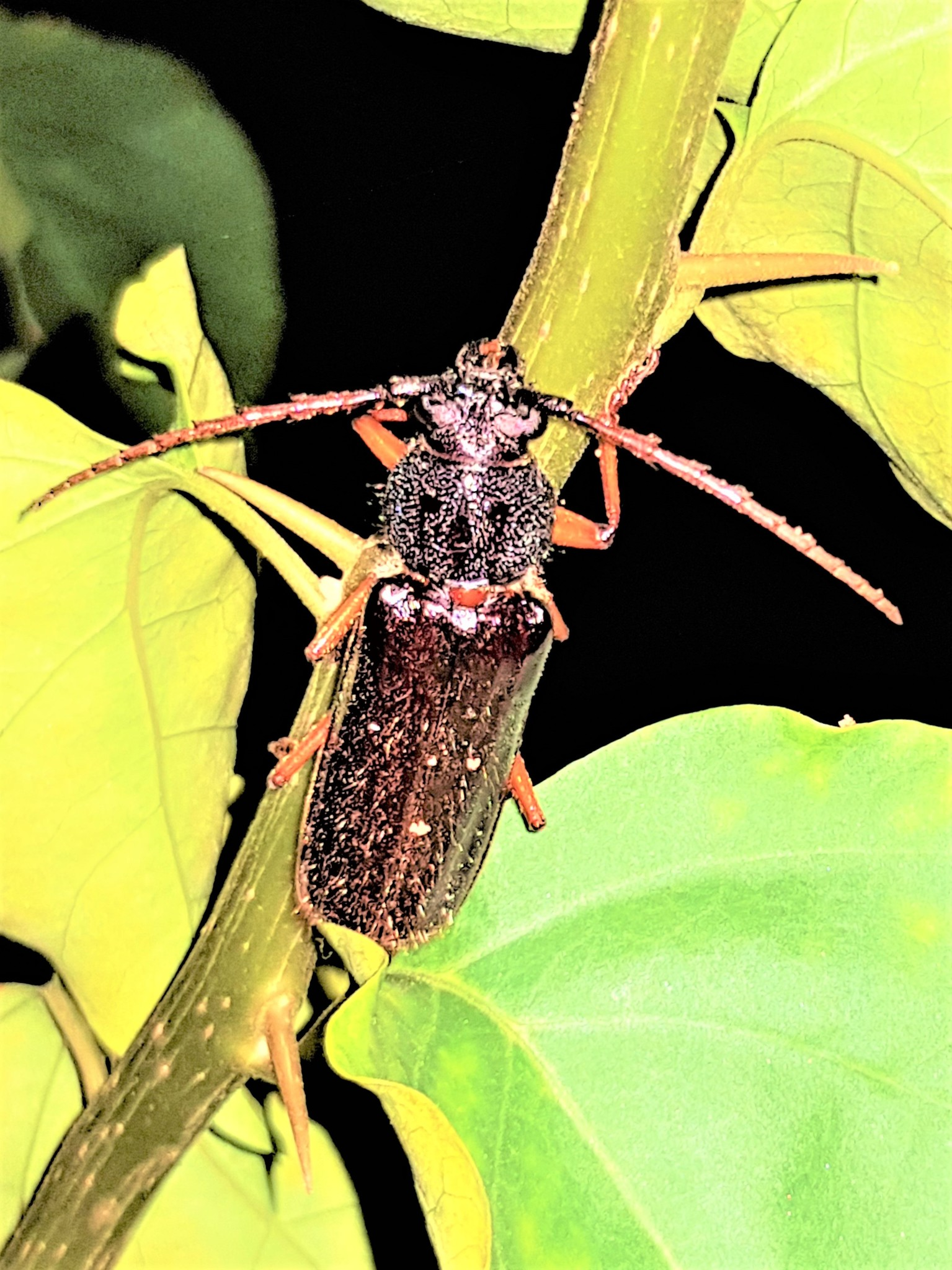
- Torneucerus armatus, Suriname

Scientific classification
- Domain: Eukaryota
- Kingdom: Animalia
- Phylum: Arthropoda
- Class: Insecta
- Order: Coleoptera
- Suborder: Polyphaga
- Infraorder: Cucujiformia
- Family: Cerambycidae
- Tribe: Torneutini
- Genus: Torneucerus; Martins & Monné, 1980
- Species: T. armatus

Binomial name
- Torneucerus armatus Martins & Monné, 1980

= Torneucerus =

Genus of beetles

Torneucerus is a genus of typical longhorn beetles in the family Cerambycidae. This genus has a single species, Torneucerus armatus, found in South America. It has been observed in Venezuela, Suriname, French Guiana, and Brazil.
