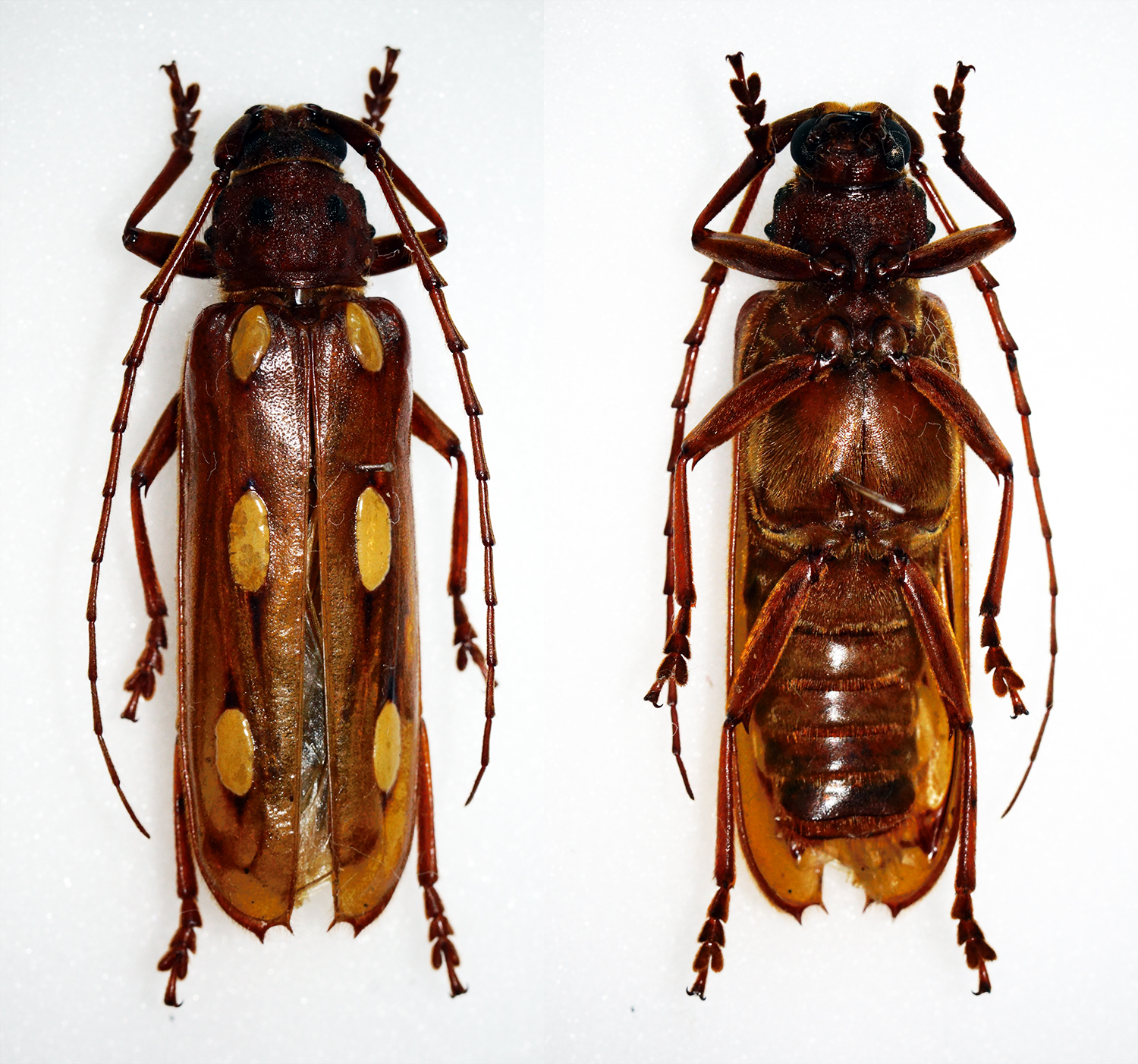
- Coccoderus timbaraba

Scientific classification
- Kingdom: Animalia
- Phylum: Arthropoda
- Class: Insecta
- Order: Coleoptera
- Suborder: Polyphaga
- Infraorder: Cucujiformia
- Family: Cerambycidae
- Subfamily: Cerambycinae
- Tribe: Torneutini
- Genus: Coccoderus; Buquet, 1840

= Coccoderus =

Genus of beetles

Coccoderus is a genus of beetles in the family Cerambycidae, containing the following species:

- Coccoderus amazonicus Bates, 1870
- Coccoderus biguttatus Martins, 1985
- Coccoderus bisignatus Buquet, 1840
- Coccoderus guianensis Tavakilian & Monné, 2002
- Coccoderus longespinicornis Fuchs, 1964
- Coccoderus novempunctatus (Germar, 1824)
- Coccoderus sexmaculatus Buquet, 1840
- Coccoderus sicki Lane, 1949
- Coccoderus speciosus Gounelle, 1909
- Coccoderus timbaraba Martins & Esteban-Durán, 2012
