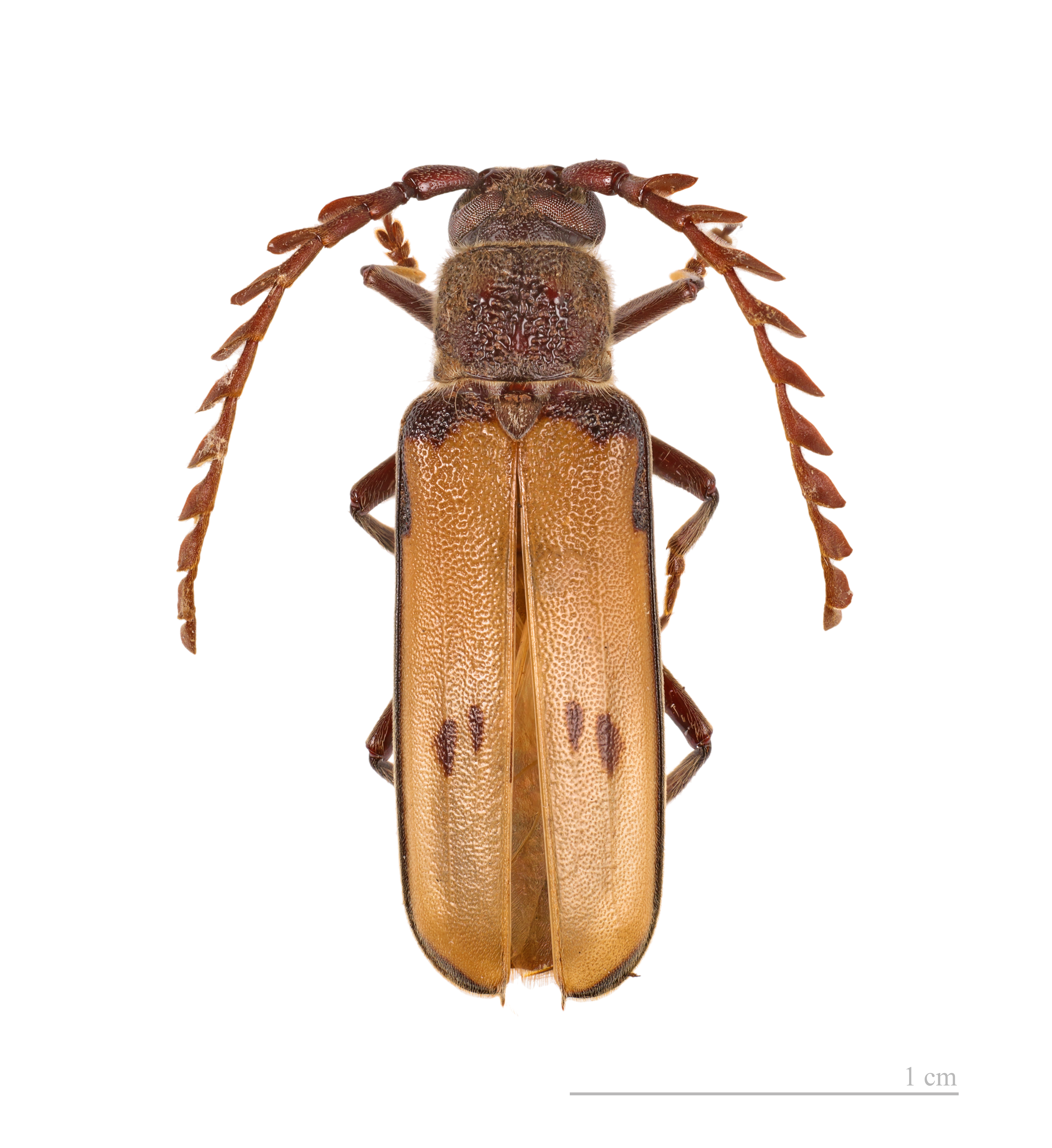
- Gigantotrichoderes conicicollis MHNT

Scientific classification
- Kingdom: Animalia
- Phylum: Arthropoda
- Class: Insecta
- Order: Coleoptera
- Suborder: Polyphaga
- Infraorder: Cucujiformia
- Family: Cerambycidae
- Tribe: Torneutini
- Genus: Gigantotrichoderes

= Gigantotrichoderes =

Genus of beetles

Gigantotrichoderes is a genus of beetles in the family Cerambycidae, containing the following species:

- Gigantotrichoderes conicicollis Tippmann, 1953
- Gigantotrichoderes flabellicornis (Zajciw, 1965)
