= Coccoderus longespinicornis =

Scientific classification
- Kingdom: Animalia
- Phylum: Arthropoda
- Class: Insecta
- Order: Coleoptera
- Suborder: Polyphaga
- Infraorder: Cucujiformia
- Family: Cerambycidae
- Genus: Coccoderus
- Species: C. longespinicornis

Binomial name
- Coccoderus longespinicornis E. Fuchs, 1964

Species of beetle

Coccoderus longespinicornis is a species of beetle in the family Cerambycidae. It was described by Ernst Fuchs in 1964.
