= Psygmatocerus pubescens =

Scientific classification
- Kingdom: Animalia
- Phylum: Arthropoda
- Class: Insecta
- Order: Coleoptera
- Suborder: Polyphaga
- Infraorder: Cucujiformia
- Family: Cerambycidae
- Genus: Psygmatocerus
- Species: P. pubescens

Binomial name
- Psygmatocerus pubescens Bruch, 1926

Species of beetle

Psygmatocerus pubescens is a species of beetle in the family Cerambycidae. It was described by Bruch in 1926.
