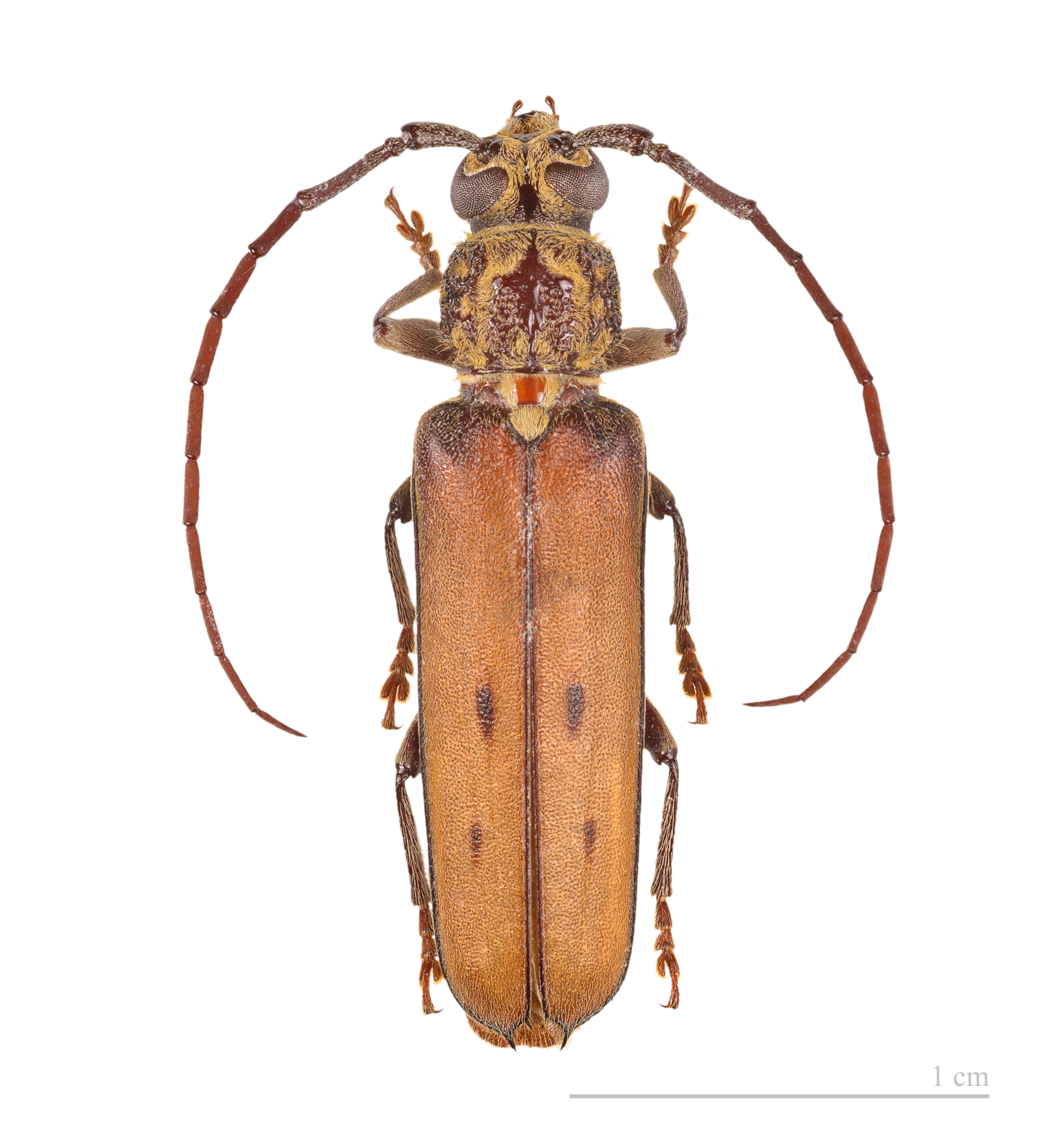

Scientific classification
- Domain: Eukaryota
- Kingdom: Animalia
- Phylum: Arthropoda
- Class: Insecta
- Order: Coleoptera
- Suborder: Polyphaga
- Infraorder: Cucujiformia
- Family: Cerambycidae
- Genus: Praxithea
- Species: P. travassosi

Binomial name
- Praxithea travassosi Lane, 1939

= Praxithea travassosi =

Species of beetle

Praxithea travassosi is a species of beetle in the family Cerambycidae. It was described by Lane in 1939.
