= Dragoneutes pilosus =

Scientific classification
- Kingdom: Animalia
- Phylum: Arthropoda
- Class: Insecta
- Order: Coleoptera
- Suborder: Polyphaga
- Infraorder: Cucujiformia
- Family: Cerambycidae
- Genus: Dragoneutes
- Species: D. pilosus

Binomial name
- Dragoneutes pilosus Monne, 2004

Species of beetle

Dragoneutes pilosus is a species of beetle in the family Cerambycidae. It was described by Monne in 2004.

== Physical Appearance ==
The Dragoneutes Pilosus has a thinner body than most Beetles, yet you would find it closer to a cockroach than one. The Beetle has two antennas that lean on the body, instead of standing up. The body of the Dragoneutes Pilosus has 3 legs, and a brown to dark orange skin color.
