= Coccoderus sexmaculatus =

Scientific classification
- Kingdom: Animalia
- Phylum: Arthropoda
- Class: Insecta
- Order: Coleoptera
- Suborder: Polyphaga
- Infraorder: Cucujiformia
- Family: Cerambycidae
- Genus: Coccoderus
- Species: C. sexmaculatus

Binomial name
- Coccoderus sexmaculatus Buquet, 1840

Species of beetle

Coccoderus sexmaculatus is a species of beetle in the family Cerambycidae. It was described by Buquet in 1840.
