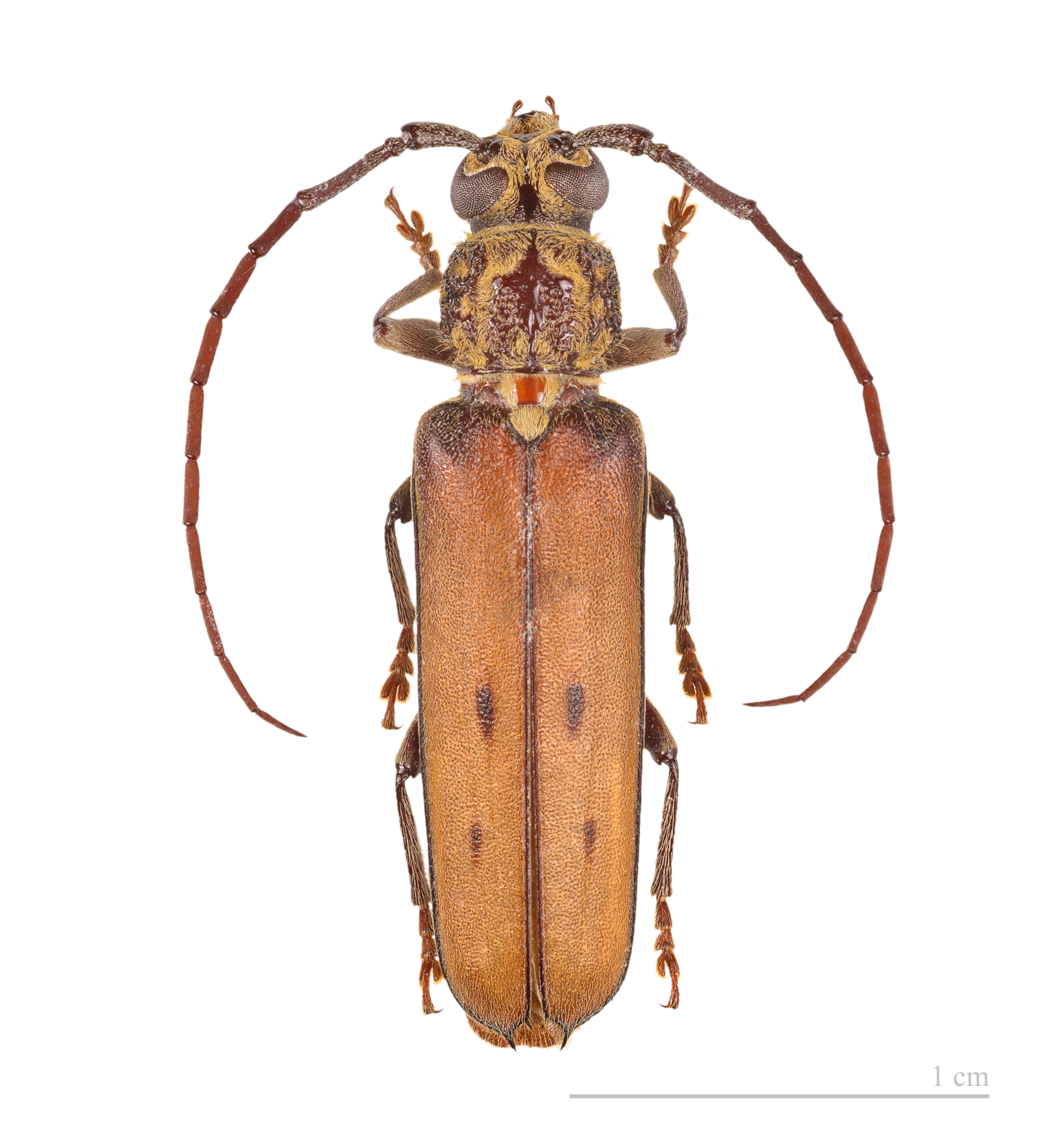
- Praxithea travassos - MHNT

Scientific classification
- Domain: Eukaryota
- Kingdom: Animalia
- Phylum: Arthropoda
- Class: Insecta
- Order: Coleoptera
- Suborder: Polyphaga
- Infraorder: Cucujiformia
- Family: Cerambycidae
- Tribe: Torneutini
- Genus: Praxithea

= Praxithea (beetle) =

Genus of beetles

Praxithea is a genus of beetles in the family Cerambycidae, containing the following species:

- Praxithea angusta Lane, 1966
- Praxithea beckeri Martins & Monné, 1980
- Praxithea borgmeieri Lane, 1938
- Praxithea chavantina Lane, 1949
- Praxithea derourei (Chabrillac, 1857)
- Praxithea fabricii (Audinet-Serville, 1834)
- Praxithea guianensis Tavakilian & Monné, 2002
- Praxithea javetii (Chabrillac, 1857)
- Praxithea lanei Joly, 1999
- Praxithea melzeri Lane, 1956
- Praxithea morvanae Tavakilian & Monné, 2002
- Praxithea peruviana Lane, 1966
- Praxithea seabrai Tavakilian & Monné, 2002
- Praxithea thomsonii (Chabrillac, 1857)
- Praxithea thouvenoti Tavakilian & Monné, 2002
- Praxithea travassosi Lane, 1939
