= Praxithea thomsonii =

Scientific classification
- Domain: Eukaryota
- Kingdom: Animalia
- Phylum: Arthropoda
- Class: Insecta
- Order: Coleoptera
- Suborder: Polyphaga
- Infraorder: Cucujiformia
- Family: Cerambycidae
- Genus: Praxithea
- Species: P. thomsonii

Binomial name
- Praxithea thomsonii (Chabrillac, 1857)

Species of beetle

Praxithea thomsonii is a species of beetle in the family Cerambycidae. It was described by Chabrillac in 1857.
