= Dragomiris quadricornutus =

Scientific classification
- Kingdom: Animalia
- Phylum: Arthropoda
- Class: Insecta
- Order: Coleoptera
- Suborder: Polyphaga
- Infraorder: Cucujiformia
- Family: Cerambycidae
- Genus: Dragomiris
- Species: D. quadricornutus

Binomial name
- Dragomiris quadricornutus Gounelle, 1913

Species of beetle

Dragomiris quadricornutus is a species of beetle in the family Cerambycidae. It was described by Gounelle in 1913.
