= Psygmatocerus wagleri =

Scientific classification
- Kingdom: Animalia
- Phylum: Arthropoda
- Clade: Pancrustacea
- Class: Insecta
- Order: Coleoptera
- Suborder: Polyphaga
- Infraorder: Cucujiformia
- Family: Cerambycidae
- Genus: Psygmatocerus
- Species: P. wagleri

Binomial name
- Psygmatocerus wagleri Perty, 1828

Synonyms
- Phaenicocerus dejeanii Gray in Griffith, 1831

Species of beetle

Psygmatocerus wagleri is a species of beetle in the family Cerambycidae. It was described by Perty in 1828.
