= Praxithea peruviana =

Scientific classification
- Domain: Eukaryota
- Kingdom: Animalia
- Phylum: Arthropoda
- Class: Insecta
- Order: Coleoptera
- Suborder: Polyphaga
- Infraorder: Cucujiformia
- Family: Cerambycidae
- Genus: Praxithea
- Species: P. peruviana

Binomial name
- Praxithea peruviana Lane, 1966

Species of beetle

Praxithea peruviana is a species of beetle in the family Cerambycidae. It was described by Lane in 1966.
