= Coccoderus bisignatus =

Scientific classification
- Kingdom: Animalia
- Phylum: Arthropoda
- Class: Insecta
- Order: Coleoptera
- Suborder: Polyphaga
- Infraorder: Cucujiformia
- Family: Cerambycidae
- Genus: Coccoderus
- Species: C. bisignatus

Binomial name
- Coccoderus bisignatus Buquet, 1840

Species of beetle

Coccoderus bisignatus is a species of beetle in the family Cerambycidae. It was described by Buquet in 1840.
