= Coccoderus biguttatus =

Scientific classification
- Kingdom: Animalia
- Phylum: Arthropoda
- Class: Insecta
- Order: Coleoptera
- Suborder: Polyphaga
- Infraorder: Cucujiformia
- Family: Cerambycidae
- Genus: Coccoderus
- Species: C. biguttatus

Binomial name
- Coccoderus biguttatus Martins, 1985

Species of beetle

Coccoderus biguttatus is a species of beetle in the family Cerambycidae. It was described by Martins in 1985.
