= Dragoneutes =

Scientific classification
- Kingdom: Animalia
- Phylum: Arthropoda
- Class: Insecta
- Order: Coleoptera
- Suborder: Polyphaga
- Infraorder: Cucujiformia
- Family: Cerambycidae
- Tribe: Torneutini
- Genus: Dragoneutes

Genus of beetles

Dragoneutes is a genus of beetles in the family Cerambycidae, containing the following species:

- Dragoneutes baculus (Gounelle, 1913)
- Dragoneutes obscurus (Guérin-Méneville, 1843)
- Dragoneutes pilosus Monne, 2004
