= Praxithea thouvenoti =

Scientific classification
- Domain: Eukaryota
- Kingdom: Animalia
- Phylum: Arthropoda
- Class: Insecta
- Order: Coleoptera
- Suborder: Polyphaga
- Infraorder: Cucujiformia
- Family: Cerambycidae
- Genus: Praxithea
- Species: P. thouvenoti

Binomial name
- Praxithea thouvenoti Tavakilian & Monné, 2002

Species of beetle

Praxithea thouvenoti is a species of beetle in the family Cerambycidae. It was described by Tavakilian and Monné in 2002.
