= Coccoderus sicki =

Scientific classification
- Kingdom: Animalia
- Phylum: Arthropoda
- Class: Insecta
- Order: Coleoptera
- Suborder: Polyphaga
- Infraorder: Cucujiformia
- Family: Cerambycidae
- Genus: Coccoderus
- Species: C. sicki

Binomial name
- Coccoderus sicki Lane, 1949

Species of beetle

Coccoderus sicki is a species of beetle in the family Cerambycidae. It was described by Lane in 1949.
