= Torneutopsis =

Scientific classification
- Domain: Eukaryota
- Kingdom: Animalia
- Phylum: Arthropoda
- Class: Insecta
- Order: Coleoptera
- Suborder: Polyphaga
- Infraorder: Cucujiformia
- Family: Cerambycidae
- Subfamily: Cerambycinae
- Tribe: Torneutini
- Genus: Torneutopsis; Martins & Monné, 1980

Genus of beetles

Torneutopsis is a genus of typical longhorn beetles in the family Cerambycidae. There is a single species in this genus, Torneutopsis translucida. It is found in Venezuela, French Guiana, and Brazil.
