= Dragoneutes obscurus =

Scientific classification
- Kingdom: Animalia
- Phylum: Arthropoda
- Clade: Pancrustacea
- Class: Insecta
- Order: Coleoptera
- Suborder: Polyphaga
- Infraorder: Cucujiformia
- Family: Cerambycidae
- Genus: Dragoneutes
- Species: D. obscurus

Binomial name
- Dragoneutes obscurus (Guérin-Méneville, 1843)

Species of beetle in the family Cerambycidae

Dragoneutes obscurus is a species of beetle in the family Cerambycidae. It was described by Félix Édouard Guérin-Méneville in 1843.
