= Praxithea javetii =

Scientific classification
- Domain: Eukaryota
- Kingdom: Animalia
- Phylum: Arthropoda
- Class: Insecta
- Order: Coleoptera
- Suborder: Polyphaga
- Infraorder: Cucujiformia
- Family: Cerambycidae
- Genus: Praxithea
- Species: P. javetii

Binomial name
- Praxithea javetii (Chabrillac, 1857)

Species of beetle

Praxithea javetii is a species of beetle in the family Cerambycidae. It was described by Chabrillac in 1857. The holotypes were collected in Brazil.

== Description ==
This beetle has brown elytra with short spines on the neds. The antennae are longer than the body and the male has short spines at the end of each segment. The thorax is mottled brown and black.
