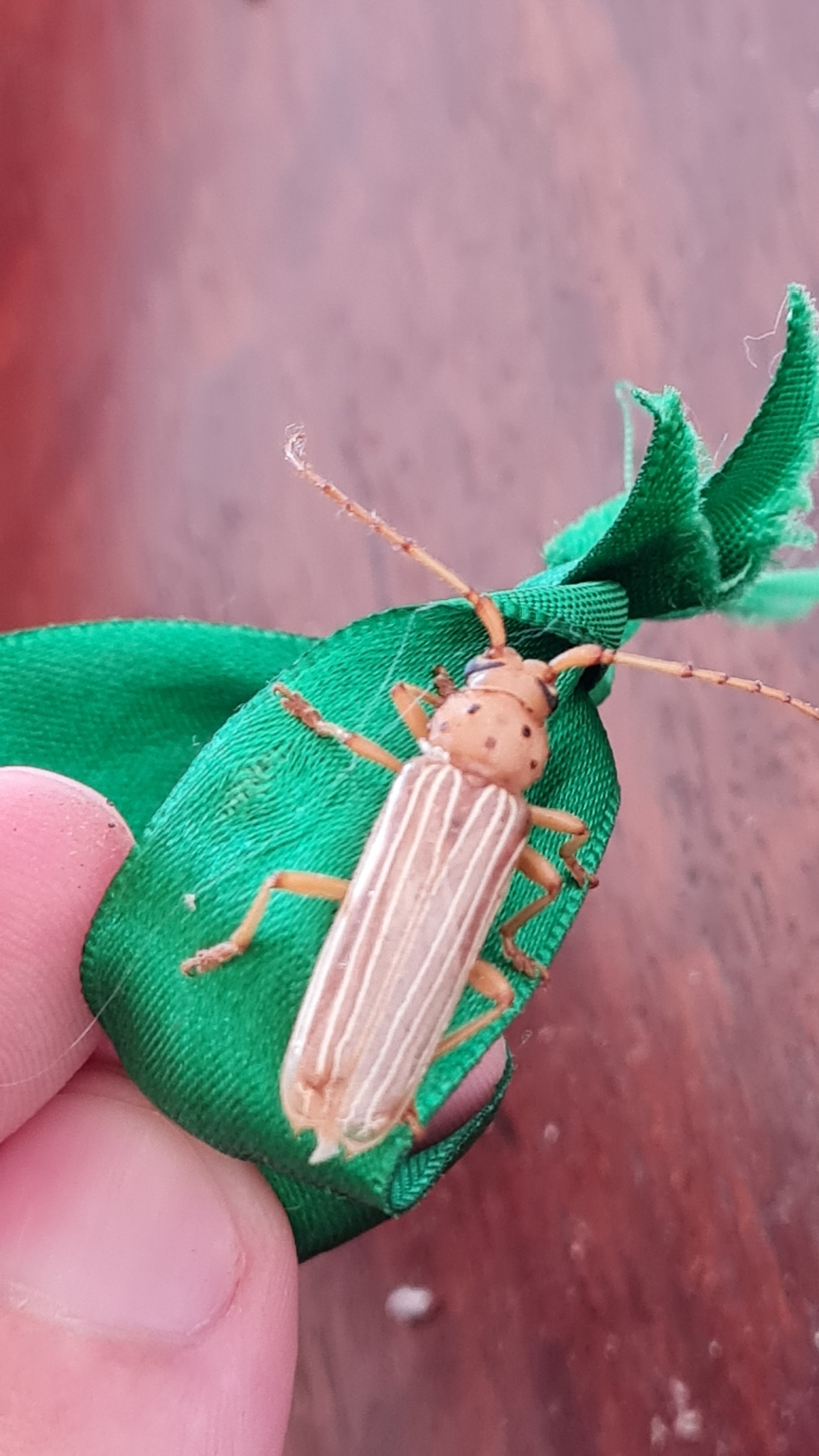

Scientific classification
- Kingdom: Animalia
- Phylum: Arthropoda
- Class: Insecta
- Order: Coleoptera
- Suborder: Polyphaga
- Infraorder: Cucujiformia
- Family: Cerambycidae
- Genus: Coccoderus
- Species: C. novempunctatus

Binomial name
- Coccoderus novempunctatus (Germar, 1824)

= Coccoderus novempunctatus =

Species of beetle

Coccoderus novempunctatus is a species of beetle in the family Cerambycidae. It was described by Ernst Friedrich Germar in 1824.
