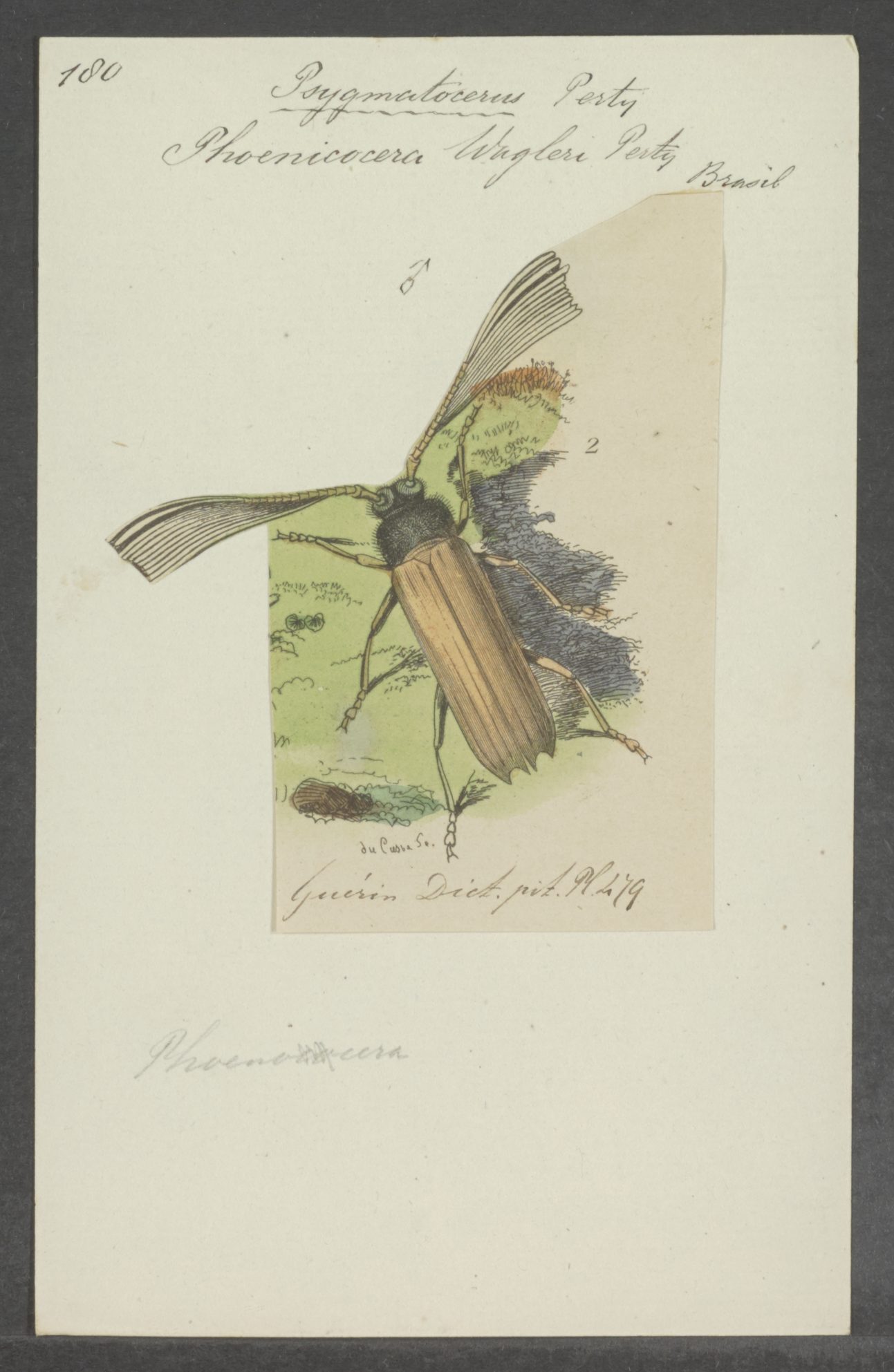

Scientific classification
- Kingdom: Animalia
- Phylum: Arthropoda
- Class: Insecta
- Order: Coleoptera
- Suborder: Polyphaga
- Infraorder: Cucujiformia
- Family: Cerambycidae
- Tribe: Torneutini
- Genus: Psygmatocerus

= Psygmatocerus =

Genus of beetles

Psygmatocerus is a genus of beetles in the family Cerambycidae, containing the following species:

- Psygmatocerus guianensis Tavakilian & Monné, 2002
- Psygmatocerus pubescens Bruch, 1926
- Psygmatocerus wagleri Perty, 1828
