= Dragomiris =

Scientific classification
- Kingdom: Animalia
- Phylum: Arthropoda
- Class: Insecta
- Order: Coleoptera
- Suborder: Polyphaga
- Infraorder: Cucujiformia
- Family: Cerambycidae
- Tribe: Torneutini
- Genus: Dragomiris

Genus of beetles

Dragomiris is a genus of beetles in the family Cerambycidae, containing the following species:

- Dragomiris major Martins & Monné, 1980
- Dragomiris quadricornutus Gounelle, 1913
