= Macellidiopygus =

Macellidiopygus debilis

Scientific classification
- Kingdom: Animalia
- Phylum: Arthropoda
- Class: Insecta
- Order: Coleoptera
- Suborder: Polyphaga
- Infraorder: Cucujiformia
- Family: Cerambycidae
- Genus: Macellidiopygus
- Species: M. debilis

Binomial name
- Macellidiopygus debilis Gounelle, 1913

Genus of beetles

Macellidiopygus debilis is a species of beetle in the family Cerambycidae, the only species in the genus Macellidiopygus.
