= Torneutes =

Scientific classification
- Domain: Eukaryota
- Kingdom: Animalia
- Phylum: Arthropoda
- Class: Insecta
- Order: Coleoptera
- Suborder: Polyphaga
- Infraorder: Cucujiformia
- Family: Cerambycidae
- Genus: Torneutes; Reich, 1837
- Species: T. pallidipennis

Binomial name
- Torneutes pallidipennis Reich, 1837

Genus of beetles

Torneutes pallidipennis is a species of beetle in the family Cerambycidae, the only species in the genus Torneutes.
