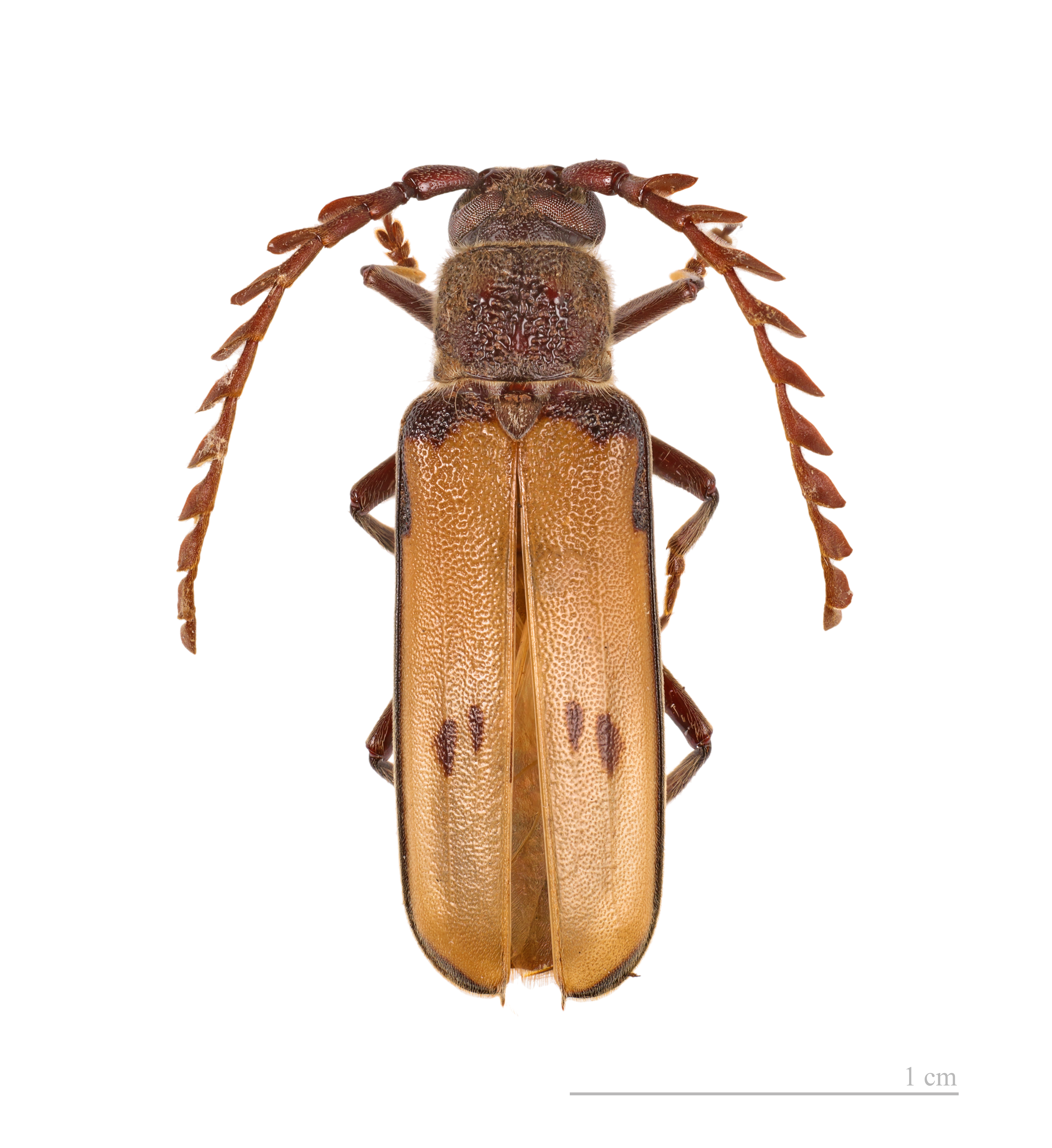

Scientific classification
- Kingdom: Animalia
- Phylum: Arthropoda
- Class: Insecta
- Order: Coleoptera
- Suborder: Polyphaga
- Infraorder: Cucujiformia
- Family: Cerambycidae
- Genus: Gigantotrichoderes
- Species: G. conicicollis

Binomial name
- Gigantotrichoderes conicicollis Tippmann, 1953

= Gigantotrichoderes conicicollis =

Species of beetle

Gigantotrichoderes conicicollis is a species of beetle in the family Cerambycidae. It was described by Tippmann in 1953.
