= Praxithea derourei =

Scientific classification
- Domain: Eukaryota
- Kingdom: Animalia
- Phylum: Arthropoda
- Class: Insecta
- Order: Coleoptera
- Suborder: Polyphaga
- Infraorder: Cucujiformia
- Family: Cerambycidae
- Genus: Praxithea
- Species: P. derourei

Binomial name
- Praxithea derourei (Chabrillac, 1857)

Species of beetle

Praxithea derourei is a species of beetle in the family Cerambycidae, described by Chabrillac in 1857.
