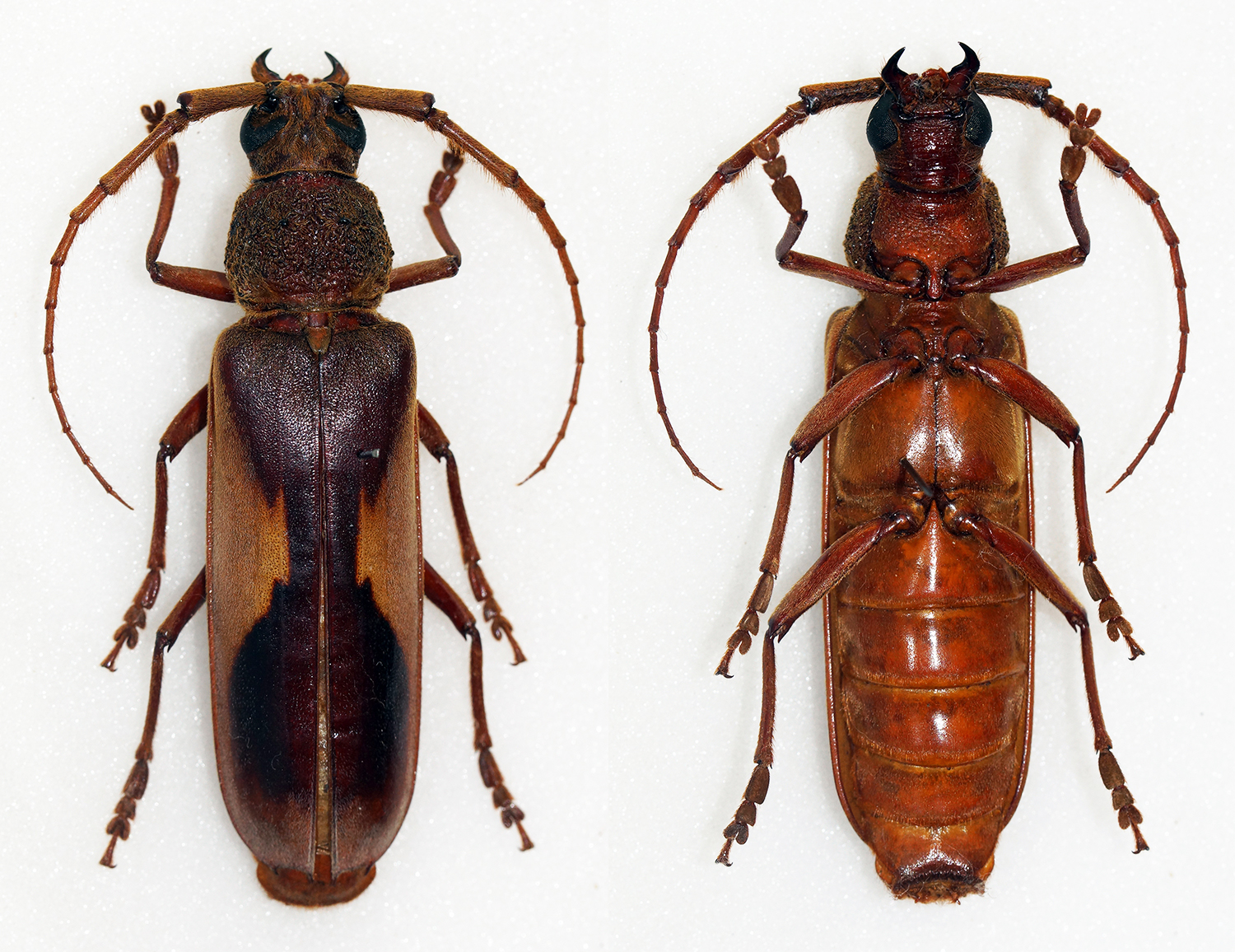
- Gnathopraxithea sarryi

Scientific classification
- Kingdom: Animalia
- Phylum: Arthropoda
- Class: Insecta
- Order: Coleoptera
- Suborder: Polyphaga
- Infraorder: Cucujiformia
- Family: Cerambycidae
- Genus: Gnathopraxithea
- Species: G. sarryi

Binomial name
- Gnathopraxithea sarryi Seabra & Tavakilian, 1986

= Gnathopraxithea =

Gnathopraxithea sarryi

Genus of beetles

Gnathopraxithea sarryi is a species of beetle in the family Cerambycidae, the only species in the genus Gnathopraxithea.
