= Spathopygus =

Spathopygus eburioides

Scientific classification
- Kingdom: Animalia
- Phylum: Arthropoda
- Class: Insecta
- Order: Coleoptera
- Suborder: Polyphaga
- Infraorder: Cucujiformia
- Family: Cerambycidae
- Genus: Spathopygus
- Species: S. eburioides

Binomial name
- Spathopygus eburioides (Blanchard in Orbigny, 1847)

Genus of beetles

Spathopygus eburioides is a species of beetle in the family Cerambycidae, the only species in the genus Spathopygus.
