= Lophoschema =

Scientific classification
- Kingdom: Animalia
- Phylum: Arthropoda
- Class: Insecta
- Order: Coleoptera
- Suborder: Polyphaga
- Infraorder: Cucujiformia
- Family: Cerambycidae
- Genus: Lophoschema
- Species: L. guayapa

Binomial name
- Lophoschema guayapa (Di Iorio, 2003)

Genus of beetle in the family Cerambycidae with a single species

Lophoschema guayapa is a species of beetle in the family Cerambycidae, the only species in the genus Lophoschema.
