= Xenambyx =

Xenambyx lansbergei

Scientific classification
- Kingdom: Animalia
- Phylum: Arthropoda
- Class: Insecta
- Order: Coleoptera
- Suborder: Polyphaga
- Infraorder: Cucujiformia
- Family: Cerambycidae
- Genus: Xenambyx
- Species: X. lansbergei

Binomial name
- Xenambyx lansbergei (Thomson, 1865)

Genus of beetles

Xenambyx lansbergei is a species of beetle in the family Cerambycidae. It is the only species in the genus Xenambyx.
