= Hoppner =

Hoppner may refer to:

== People ==
- Henry Parkyns Hoppner (1795–1833), officer of the Royal Navy, Arctic explorer, and draughtsman/artist
- John Hoppner (1758–1810), English portrait-painter; father of Henry Parkyns Hoppner
- Reinhard Höppner (1948–2014), German politician
- Jason Hoppner
- Trent Hoppner (born 1979), Australian rules footballer

== Places ==
- Cape Hoppner, Northwest Territories, Canada
- Hoppner Inlet, Nunavut, Canada
- Hoppner Island, Ontario, Canada
- Hoppner River, Nunavut, Canada
- Hoppner Strait, Nunavut, Canada

== See also ==
- Hoeppner
