= Frederick Muhlenberg (disambiguation) =

Frederick Muhlenberg (1750–1801) was the first Speaker of the U.S. House of Representatives.

Frederick Muhlenberg may also refer to:

- Frederick Augustus Muhlenberg (1887–1980), architect, Army officer and U.S. congressman from Pennsylvania
- Frederick Augustus Muhlenberg (educator) (1818–1901), president of Muhlenberg College

== See also ==
- Portrait of Frederick Muhlenberg, portrait of Frederick Muhlenberg (1750–1801) by Joseph Wright
