= The Speaker's House =

Former home of Frederick Muhlenberg

Coordinates: 40.195547°N 75.467996°W

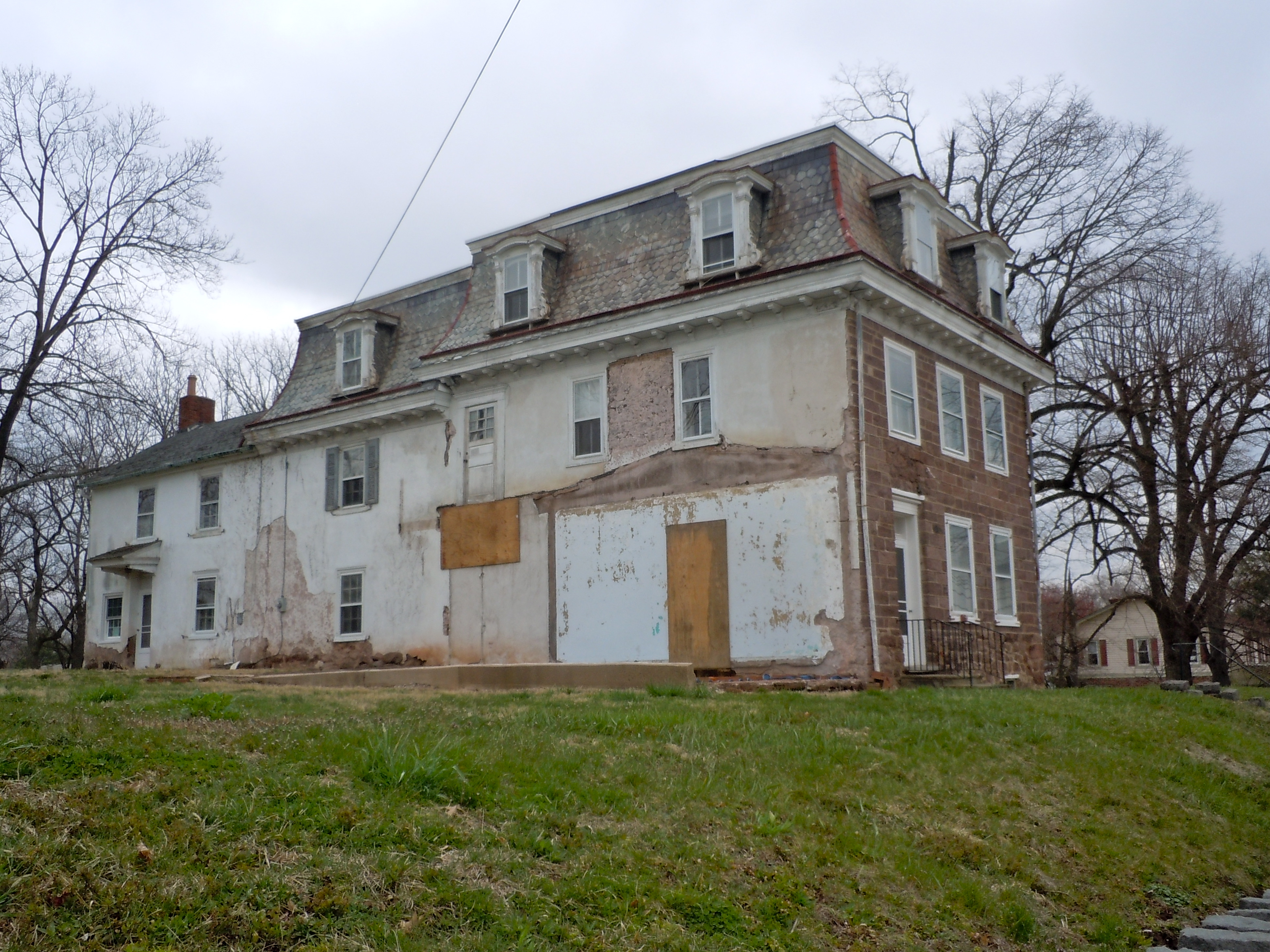
Speaker's House in 2011

The Speaker's House is a museum located in Trappe, in Montgomery County, Pennsylvania that preserves the home of Frederick Muhlenberg, the First and Third Speaker of the United States House of Representatives. The house was built in 1763, bought by Muhlenberg in 1781, and occupied by his family until 1791.

== History ==
=== Trappe, 1717–1781 ===
The first settlers of Trappe were German immigrants John Jacob Schrack (1679–1742) and his wife Eva Rosina Lang Schrack (1688–1756), who settled there in 1717. The Schracks had seven children: John Joseph, twins Maria Sabina and Anna Maria, Christian, Philip, Elizabeth, and John Jacob Jr. John Jacob Schrack Sr. was a valuable member of the local community and Lutheran church. He operated a tavern known formally as the Sign of Three Crowns but popularly as "the Trap", after which the town was named. In 1742, Henry Melchior Muhlenberg, a Lutheran pastor, arrived in Trappe. The Schrack's oldest son, known as John, ran the family tavern after his father's death in 1742. John married a woman named Silence, who was from New England (1712–1777). They had two sons and five daughters. In 1763, they constructed the house later owned by Frederick Muhlenberg, now known as The Speaker's House. After John's death in 1772, his widow Silence Schrack sold the house to James Diemer for £725.

James Diemer married Elizabeth Currie on December 5, 1759, at Gloria Dei Church in Philadelphia. He may be the same James Diemer (d. 1820) of Reading who was active in public service, as a justice of the peace and later a judge (from 1791 to 1819). Diemer sold the property on 6 November 1775 to Michael Connor, a merchant of Philadelphia, for £905. Connor was married on 9 January 1774 to Mary Cottringer or Gatringer. Connor and his wife evidently lived in the house, as Henry Muhlenberg described the Connors as his neighbors. The Connors sold the house on March 1, 1777, to merchant John Patton (1745–1804) for £1,500 only six days before his marriage to Jane Davis (1752–1832). Connor was an Irish immigrant who arrived in America in 1745. In March 1776, he joined the Continental Army as a Major in the 9th Pennsylvania Regiment; the following year he was promoted to colonel. The Connors did reside in the house, as a letter written by Peter Muhlenberg in 1799 describes the home now known as The Speaker's House as "the house below him where Col. Patton had lived." John and Jane Patton had eleven or twelve children; Benjamin, the oldest, may have been born while they lived in Trappe. Patton sold the house in September 1778 to Isaac Connely (1747–1823) for £2350. Only 22 days later, Connely it to innkeeper John Reed (1723–1790) and his wife Dorothy. Henry Melchior Muhlenberg refers to Reed as "Neighbor Reed" and purchased goods from him such as firewood, beef, veal, pork, salt, rye and oats. In May 1781, Reed offered to rent out "2 large rooms in his big house, half of the cellar, adequate firewood, and fodder for his horse at 20 pounds silver money a year." In December 1781, he sold the house and property to Frederick Muhlenberg.

=== Muhlenberg ownership, 1781–1791 ===
Born in Trappe on January 1, 1750, Frederick Muhlenberg died on June 4, 1801. He was one of eleven children born to Henry Melchior Muhlenberg (1711–1787) and his wife Anna Maria Weiser (1727–1802). His father was head of the German Lutheran Church in America from 1742 until his death in 1787. Frederick was educated in Germany and ordained a Lutheran minister on his return in 1770. The following year, he married Catharine Schaeffer (1750–1835). They had seven children: Henry William, Maria, Elisabeth, Margaret, Ann Catherine, Frederick, and John Peter David. For several years Frederick served Lutheran congregations in the Tulpehocken Valley of Berks and Lebanon counties. In 1773, he accepted a call to minister to the Christ or Swamp Church in New York. As signs of revolution began to emerge, Frederick and his family left New York in 1776 and returned to Pennsylvania, where they stayed briefly with his parents in Trappe before moving to the nearby town of New Hanover for several years. In 1779, Frederick left the ministry to enter politics and became a member of the Continental Congress to fulfill the term of Edward Biddle. The following year, he was elected Speaker of the Pennsylvania Assembly. On December 19, 1781, Frederick purchased a stone house and sizable property in Trappe for £800. Located next to his parents' house, it would provide support for Frederick's wife and children during the long absences necessitated by his new career. Half of the money for the purchase was provided by Frederick's business partner, Christopher Wegman, whom he repaid in 1785. Frederick's political career continued to rise when in 1783 he was elected President of the Council of Censors for Philadelphia County. When Montgomery County was established in September 1784, he was appointed the first Register of Wills and Recorder of Deeds. His Trappe home served as both a private residence and de facto seat of government, as there was not yet an official courthouse. Frederick also operated a general store on the property, which sold goods such as sugar, tea, coffee, tobacco, fabric, sewing supplies, and ready-made clothing. When his father-in-law David Schaeffer Sr. died in 1787, Frederick and his wife inherited a part-ownership of a sugar refinery in Philadelphia. Frederick bought out the other owners and formed a partnership with Jacob Lawersyler which lasted until 1800.

In 1787, Frederick was president of the Pennsylvania Constitutional Convention. The following year, he was elected to the House of Representatives in the First United States Congress. When the Congress convened the following spring, he was elected the first Speaker of the House, a role which required a significant amount of entertaining and thus merited a salary twice that of other congressmen. While Speaker, Frederick Muhlenberg was the first Signer of the Bill of Rights. After the federal government relocated from New York to Philadelphia in 1790, Frederick sold the Trappe property and moved to Philadelphia. He also became a Trustee of the University of Pennsylvania and served as president of the German Society of Pennsylvania from 1790 to 1797.

While residing in Philadelphia, Frederick's political life continued to ascend. He was elected to the Second, Third, and Fourth Congresses and served again as Speaker during the Third Congress. During the Fourth Congress, Muhlenberg became the chairman of the committee to the Whole and moderated the debate over appropriations to support the Jay Treaty with Great Britain. The Federalists supported this agreement, but the Jeffersonians were against it. As chairman, Muhlenberg cast the deciding vote in favor of appropriating the funds. The vote ended his political career and nearly his life when Muhlenberg's own brother-in-law, Bernhard Schaeffer, stabbed him afterwards. Muhlenberg was not renominated for the Fifth Congress. In 1799, he was appointed Receiver General of Pennsylvania Land Office by Governor Thomas McKean. He then moved with his family to Lancaster, which was then the state capital, to take up his new office. There he died of a stroke on June 4, 1801.

=== After Frederick Muhlenberg ===
Frederick Muhlenberg sold the property in 1791 to his sister and brother-in-law, Mary and Francis Swaine. It is possible that the Swaines resided in the house prior to buying it. The Swaines had four children, all of whom died during the 1790s; three are buried at Augustus Lutheran Church.

According to the 1798 Federal Direct Tax, the house was assessed at 800 dollars and the property at 1,380 dollars. The two-story 30 by 25-foot (7.6 m) stone dwelling had a total square footage of 1,500. Four outbuildings were assessed, including a stone kitchen 20 feet (6.1 m) by 15 feet (4.6 m), a stone store room, also 20 feet (6.1 m) by 15 feet (4.6 m), and a stone store, 20 feet (6.1 m) by 30 feet (9.1 m). The stone barn was 30 feet (9.1 m) by 40 feet (12 m).

In January 1799, Peter Muhlenberg wrote a letter to Taverner Beale in which he noted that he still resided in the same house (previously of his father, Henry Melchior Muhlenberg), and that Mr. Swaine lived in the first house below him where Col. Patton lived. He also noted that Swaine managed a store and was a magistrate.

The Swaines advertised the house for sale on November 24, 1803. It was bought by Charles Albrecht, a pianomaker, of Philadelphia. The sale included 3 tracts of land: the 50-acre (200,000 m^{2}) and the 5 3/4 quarter acre tracts Swaine had purchased from Muhlenberg, and the 11 acres (45,000 m^{2}) and 9 perches purchased from Magargel (on the 1803 deed the Magargel tract was measured at 10 acres 89 perches).

==== 19th century ====
The first owner of The Speaker's House at the start of the 19th century was Charles Albrecht (c. 1759–1848), a German immigrant and musical instrument maker. In 1787 he married the widow Maria Fuchs (later anglicized to Mary Fox) of Philadelphia. Albrecht became an American citizen on February 15, 1798. That he resided in Trappe is evidenced by his absence from the Philadelphia city directories from 1805 through 1808, coinciding with his ownership of The Speaker's House. The tax records also note his occupation as an instrument maker.

Charles Albrecht advertised the house for sale on April 1, 1808. It was bought by Abraham Gotwals, Esquire, who resided in Upper Providence Township, for $1,750.

Abraham Gotwals (born 1764) was the son of John Adam Gotwals (1719–1795), a German immigrant. He married Magdalena Detweiler (1764–1830) in 1785 and they had a total of 12 children. The family is listed in the 1810 U.S. Census as residents of Upper Providence Township, with a household of eleven people: three under ten, three between ten and fifteen, and three between sixteen and twenty five, in addition to the two parents who were then both forty six. On April 29, 1811, Abraham and Magdalena put the property up for sale. It was bought by Sarah Bartleson for $5,600. Apparently, Abraham and his family hadn't lived in Trappe for some time, as according to the deed, he lived in Perkiomen Township.

Sarah Bartleson (1790–1838) was the wife of Dr. William Johnson (1785–1831). They were married on June 11, 1811. According to the deed, the $5,600 was paid by Israel Bartleson. In 1820, the household consisted of William, Sarah, and three children, all then under 10 years old, and one male aged between 16 and 26 years old, probably a farm hand. Ten years later, there was one male between 10 and 15 (son William), one male between 40 and 50 (Dr. Johnson), one male between 50 and 60 (identity unknown), one female between 10 and 15 (daughter Sarah), one female between 15 and 20 (daughter Mary), two females between 40 and 50 (Sarah, and an unknown woman) and one female between 60 and 70 (identity unknown).

A neighbor, Henry A. Hunsicker, later recalled a "one story wing attached to the east side of the house, fronting the turnpike, which was used for store purposes, and which was at one time occupied by Felty Fitzgerald, who sold watermelons and truck." This was Valentine Fitzgerald (b. 1795), a day laborer and member of Augustus Lutheran Church.

In 1831, Dr. William Johnson died. His widow Sarah claimed about $88 in household goods; another $221 in possessions were sold, including furniture, surgical instruments, medical books and a "Shower Bath." According to historical records, at the time that their daughter Sarah died 10 years later when she was 25, she owned the following: piano, furniture, silverware, jewelry and other items valued at $595, in addition to a dower fund.

When it came time to settle Sarah Johnson's estate, her executor Wright Bringhurst divided the property into two equal tracts. The tract of 16 acres (65,000 m^{2}) and 52 perches containing the house was put on the market on December 27, 1841, and bought by Enos Lewis, who was the brother of Wright's mother Mary Lewis Bringhurst. The other tract of 16 acres (65,000 m^{2}) and 106 1/2 perches was sold to clockmaker George Hagey.

Enos Lewis, who was married to Margaret Dewees, reunited the two tracts in March 1849. In the 1850 U.S. census, the occupants are listed as Enos, aged 68; Margaret, aged 50; Ann Hess, aged 17; Susanna Clemmens, a mulatto girl aged 12; and Joshua Davis, a black laborer aged 40. Enos and Margaret Lewis sold the house on April 2, 1855, to Samuel Townsend of Philadelphia.

Samuel Townsend (1817–1860) was 38 when he acquired the property. In either 1854 or 1855, his brother Thomas came to the property as a laborer. Their time together was not always peaceful—records show that Thomas refused to leave the farm unless Samuel would financially provide for him according to promises made to him prior to this.

After Samuel Townsend's death, the house was sold to Henry Shuler (1817–1864) on March 17, 1860. Shuler died four years later on May 3, 1864. The property was put up for sale and bought by Dr. Lewis Royer on September 20 of 1867. He remodeled it to suit current tastes, demolished the store on the east side of the house, and built a frame addition on the west side. He sold the property on April 10, 1884, to Aaron D. Wagner, but in 1890 bought it back and remained in possession of it until his death in 1908.

==== 20th century ====
Andrew Heyser Detwiler (1863–1933) bought the property from Lewis Royer's estate in 1908, which totaled 29 acres (120,000 m^{2}) and 92 and 22/100 perches. In October 1924, he sold it to brothers Henry W. and Percy W. Mathieu. They sold it four weeks later to Ursinus College. Ursinus College bought the property to alleviate a campus housing shortage. The house was renamed "Highland Hall" and renovated to accommodate 26 to 28 male students, with quarters for a houseman and caretaker. A new 100-foot (30 m) artesian well was drilled and fitted with a pump, additional bathing and toilet facilities were installed, and clothes closets were constructed in several rooms. A steam heater system was also installed. In 1925, the house became known as the Ursinus College Athletic Club and housed the male varsity players. In 1930, it became the private residence of the college's athletic director, Russell "Jing" Johnson (1894–1950), and his family. According to historical records, the Johnson family resided in the house from roughly 1931 to 1937. In 1933, Ursinus made several more renovations including the removal of the front porch and installation of a flagstone terrace. A pent roof was also installed on the front and east side of the building. By 1942, Ursinus was using the house again as a women's residence hall. In 1944, faced with declining enrollment due to World War II, Ursinus put the house up for sale and it was bought by Andrew and Myrtle Rihl. Prior to that, the college had sold much of the land in a bargain sale for $100 to the newly formed Collegeville-Trappe School District in 1938. On July 6, 1950, the Riehls sold the house to Henry L. Haas (1908–1894) and his first wife, Anna. After her death he remarried to Lenore. By the 1960s, the Haases had converted the second and third floors to rental apartments, while they resided on the first floor.

== Founding of The Speaker's House ==
In 1999, a commercial developer sought to buy the property and demolish the house in order to erect a drugstore. Local residents rallied to save the house and founded a 501(c)3 non-profit in 2001 known as Save the Speaker's House, Inc. This organization purchased the property on April 1, 2004, and in 2005 obtained a grant from the Institute of Museum and Library Services that provided funds to begin researching the property and prepare a Historic Structure Report (HSR) to document the house in its present condition. This included tree-ring analysis, or dendrochronology, which involved taking core samples from joists in the house and comparing them with known dated samples. The study revealed that the house was built in 1763, when John Schrack owned the property. Archaeological work began in 2006 and resulted in the property becoming the first in the Borough of Trappe to be registered as an official state archaeological site. Among the most important findings was the foundation of Frederick Muhlenberg's general store, which was attached to the east side of the house.

In 2006 the organization paid off its mortgage with a grant from the Montgomery County Green Fields/Green Towns Open Space Program, resulting in the property being placed under a conservation easement to ensure that it be permanently preserved as open space. To mark this success, the organization officially changed its name to The Speaker's House. On April 12, 2008, a Pennsylvania Historical and Museum Commission roadside marker was dedicated on the property to acknowledge the life and legacy of Frederick Muhlenberg.

The mission of The Speaker's House is to inspire leadership and civic engagement by bringing to life the home and legacy of Frederick Muhlenberg, first Speaker of the U.S. House of Representatives.

=== Portraits ===
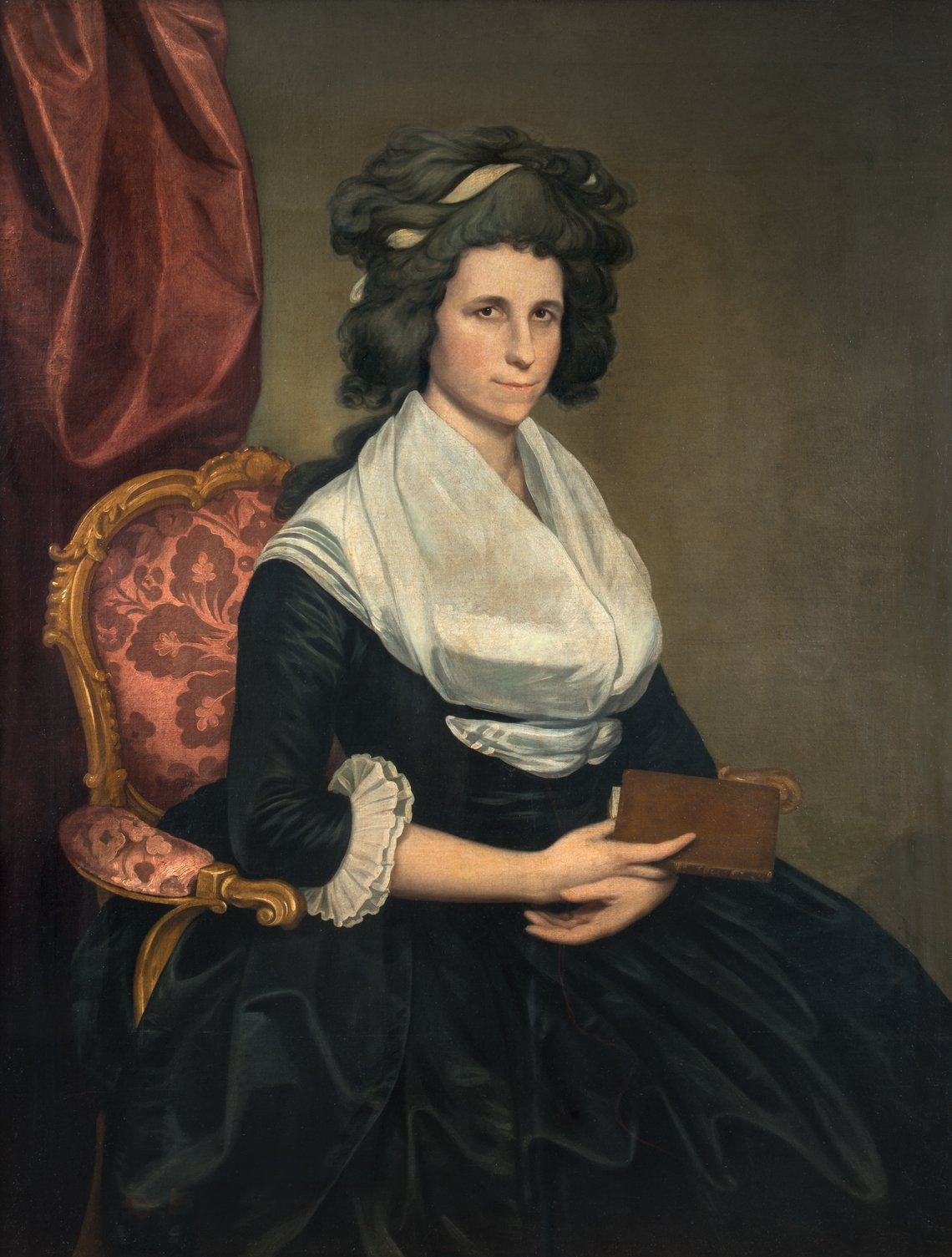
Catharine Schaeffer Muhlenberg (c.1790) by Joseph Wright, on loan to The Speaker's House, Trappe, Pennsylvania.

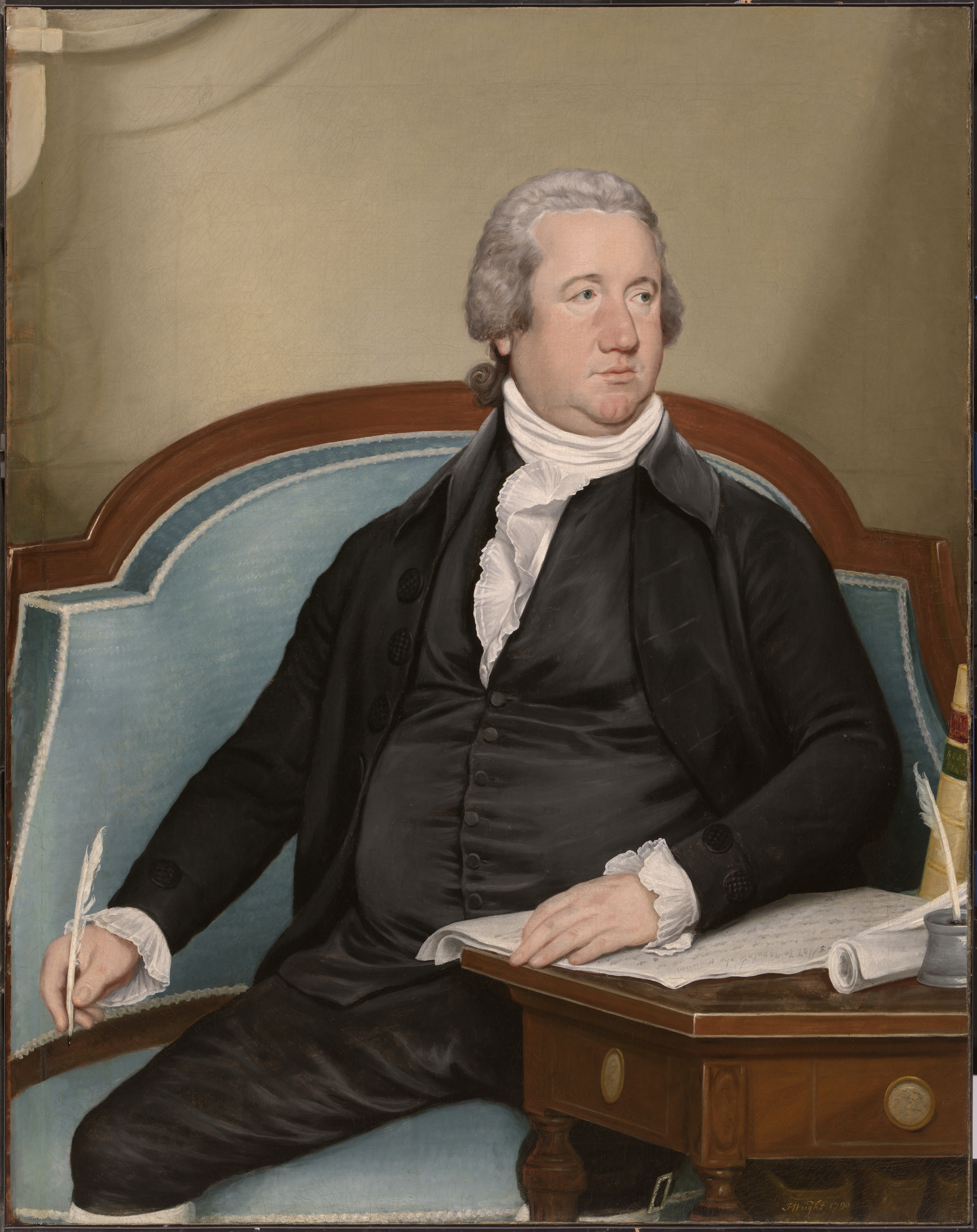
Frederick Augustus Conrad Muhlenberg (1790) by Joseph Wright, National Portrait Gallery, Washington, D.C.

The position of Speaker of the U.S. House of Representatives was established by Article 1, Section 2 of the U.S. Constitution. Frederick Muhlenberg was a member of the First U.S. Congress (under the Constitution), which was sworn in on March 4, 1789. The First Congress elected Muhlenberg as its first Speaker on April 1, 1789. New York City served as the first capital of the United States, and the First Congress met there in 1789 for its First Session and in 1790 for its Second Session. Philadelphia served as the second capital of the United States – for a 10-year period while Washington, D.C. was under construction – from December 1790 to November 1800.

Muhlenberg commissioned artist Joseph Wright to paint his portrait. The portrait depicts Muhlenberg seated in the Speaker's chair at Federal Hall in New York City, holding a quill pen and in the process of signing House Bill 65, "An Act to regulate Trade and Intercourse with the Indian Tribes," which he signed on July 20, 1790. Wright is presumed to have painted the portrait in New York City, either toward the end of the First Congress's Second Session (January 4, 1790 – August 12, 1790) or in the recess between the Second and Third Sessions. The First Congress's Third Session (December 6, 1790 – March 3, 1791) was in Philadelphia. The Speaker's portrait is the only known life image of Frederick Muhlenberg, and the only known image of the interior of Federal Hall.

Muhlenberg also commissioned Wright to paint a portrait of his wife, Catharine Schaeffer Muhlenberg. The pendant portraits descended through the Muhlenberg family, and were owned by "the family of Mrs. George Brooke, of Birdsboro, Pa." in 1910. The portraits passed on to her sons—Edward Brooke II inherited the Speaker's portrait, and George Brooke Jr., that of the wife. Edward Brooke II's eldest son, George Brooke III, inherited the Speaker's portrait in 1940, and married Virginia Muhlenberg, also a descendant of the Speaker, in 1942. Virginia Muhlenberg Brooke lent the Speaker's portrait to the National Portrait Gallery for its inaugural exhibition in the Old Patent Office Building, in 1968. The museum purchased it from her in 1974.

"Brookewood," George Brooke Jr.'s mansion in Birdsboro, burned on Christmas Day, 1917. The Catharine Muhlenberg portrait had remained unpublished since 1910, and scholar Monroe H. Fabian presumed that it had been lost in the 1917 fire. George Brooke Jr.'s only child, Elizabeth Muhlenberg Brooke Blake, of Dallas, Texas, became interested in The Speaker's House, and was awarded the museum's 2011 Speaker's Choice Award. After her death in 2016, at age 100, her sons located the Catharine Muhlenberg portrait in the attic of her Newport, Rhode Island house. The Blakes have placed the portrait on long-term loan to The Speaker's House.

The Speaker's House owns a 19th-century copy of Wright's Frederick Muhlenberg portrait. Unsigned, but attributed to artist Jacob Eichholtz, it was donated to the museum by a Muhlenberg descendant in 2007.
