= Patience Wright =

American sculptor (1725–1786)

- Portrait of Patience Wright by Robert Edge Pine, 1782
- Born: Patience Lovell; 1725; Oyster Bay, New York, British America
- Died: March 23, 1786 (aged 60–61); London, England, Great Britain
- Occupation: Sculpture
- Spouse: Joseph Wright (m. 1748; died 1769)
- Children: 4, including Joseph Wright
- Relatives: John Hoppner (son-in-law); Henry Parkyns Hoppner (grandson)

Patience Wright (born Lovell; 1725 – March 23, 1786) was a sculptor of wax figures, and the first recognized American-born sculptor. Wright is recorded as creating at least 55 works; only her full-length figure of Lord Chatham (William Pitt) survives.

== Biography ==
=== Early life ===
Patience Lovell was born at Oyster Bay, New York, into a Quaker farm family with a vegetarian diet. The family moved to Bordentown, New Jersey, when Patience was four years old.

At age 16, she left the family home and moved to Philadelphia, where in 1748 she married Joseph Wright, a barrelmaker who was many years her senior. She often amused herself and her children by molding faces out of putty, bread dough, and wax.

=== Turn to sculpture ===
When Wright's husband died in 1769, she was pregnant with a fourth child and needed a way to support the family. Working with her sister Rachel Wells, who by then was also a widow, she turned her hobby into a full-time occupation. The sisters set up a business molding portraits in tinted wax, a popular art form in colonial America, and charged admission to see them. By 1770, they had become successful enough to open a waxworks house in New York City and mount tours of their work to Philadelphia and Charleston. Contemporary physician Solomon Drowne mentions a visit to the waxworks in his journals.

Wright's portraits were life-sized figures or busts with real clothing and glass eyes. They were modeled from life and were considered to be very lifelike. They were often placed in tableaux, illustrating the activities the portrayed individual might have undertaken in life.

=== Move to London ===
After many of her sculptures were destroyed in a fire in June 1771, Wright moved to London, England. Through a relationship with Jane Mecom, sister of Benjamin Franklin, she made her entry into London society. Wright settled in the West End and set up a popular waxworks show of historical tableaux and celebrity wax figures. She was honored with an invitation to model King George III, and would go on to sculpt other members of British royalty and nobility.

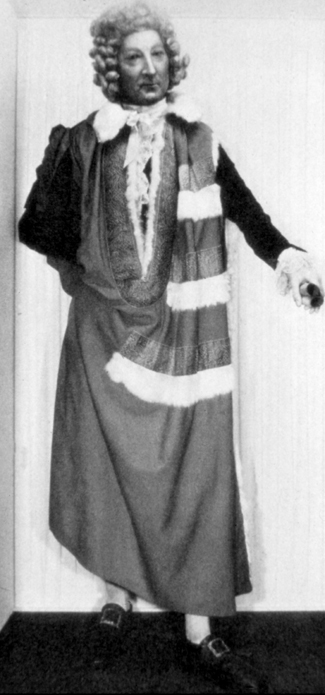
Wright's statue of William Pitt

Wright became known in London society for her rustic American manners, which were a source of both fascination and scandal. She wore wooden shoes, kissed members of both sexes and all classes in greeting, and in general did not follow the contemporary rules of comportment for someone of her class or gender. One rumor held that she had even called the king and queen by their first names, in an outrageous breach of conduct. Her reputation for unruliness led to the nickname "The Promethean Modeler", and she gained a level of celebrity in 18th-century London. Wright famously offended Abigail Adams with her overfamiliarity and lack of modesty about her skills. Adams wrote a disparaging letter home describing their encounter, describing her as "the queen of sluts."

Wright's technique for sculpting wax contributed to this public conception of her character. She used body heat to keep the wax at a temperature where she could shape it, molding it under her apron in a suggestive manner, which scandalized viewers and was even parodied in newspaper cartoons. The medium itself was a form of "low art" and considered unrefined when compared to sculpture in bronze or stone.

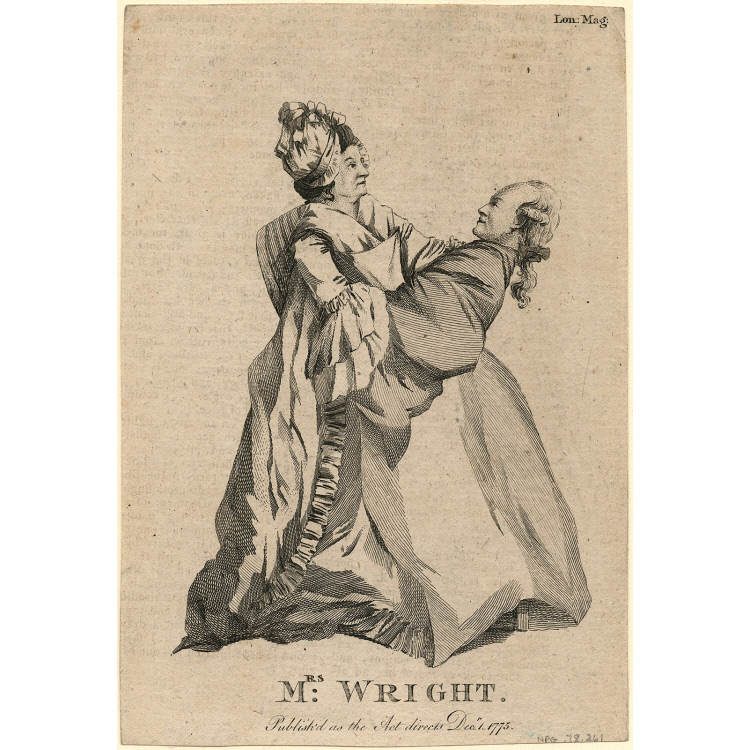
Satirical newspaper cartoon of Patience Wright

Wright may have used this unconventional public persona as a way to drive business to her waxworks, making savvy use of newspaper coverage to get publicity for her artwork.

=== Revolutionary War ===
Wright fell from royal favor as a result of her open support for the colonial cause, especially after she reportedly scolded the king and queen after the 1775 battles of Lexington and Concord.

Wright is said to have worked as a spy during the American Revolution, sending information back to the colonies inside her wax figures. The accuracy of this legend has been contested.

She is known to have corresponded with Benjamin Franklin during the war, sending letters reporting on the health of his illegitimate son, William. She also wrote letters to John Dickinson describing the British Army's preparations in England.

She advocated on behalf of prisoners of war held in Britain, starting a fund to support them and writing to Franklin on their behalf. A group of pro-American activists, including Lord George Gordon, Benjamin West, and Anthony Pasquin, would meet at her London workshop to discuss their cause.

Wright moved to Paris in 1780, where she modeled a portrait of Benjamin Franklin.

=== Postwar and death ===
Wright returned to England in 1782 and settled with her daughter Phoebe and her son-in-law, painter John Hoppner, at their home on Charles Street at St. James's Square.

By 1785, she had decided to return to New Jersey. However, as she was making preparations to travel, she suffered a bad fall and broke her leg. Wright died a week later, on March 23, 1786. Her sister Rachel attempted to get financial assistance for her burial expenses, both from prominent American citizens and then from the Continental Congress, but was not successful. Wright was buried in London. Her burial place is in the St John's Wood Burial Ground, in St John's Wood, London.

Although Wright had obtained George Washington's agreement to sit for a portrait with her, she died before she could sculpt him. A similar request sent to Thomas Jefferson would go unanswered.

== Works ==
The fragility of her medium means that few of Wright's works survive today. A full-length figure of William Pitt, produced after the Earl's death, stands in Westminster Abbey Museum. A bas-relief profile of Admiral Richard Howe in the collection of the Newark Museum is attributed to her.

Wright's also made sculptures of Lord Lyttelton, Thomas Penn, and Charles James Fox. Wright's patrons included the King and Queen of England, Pitt, Benjamin Franklin, and Deborah Sampson.

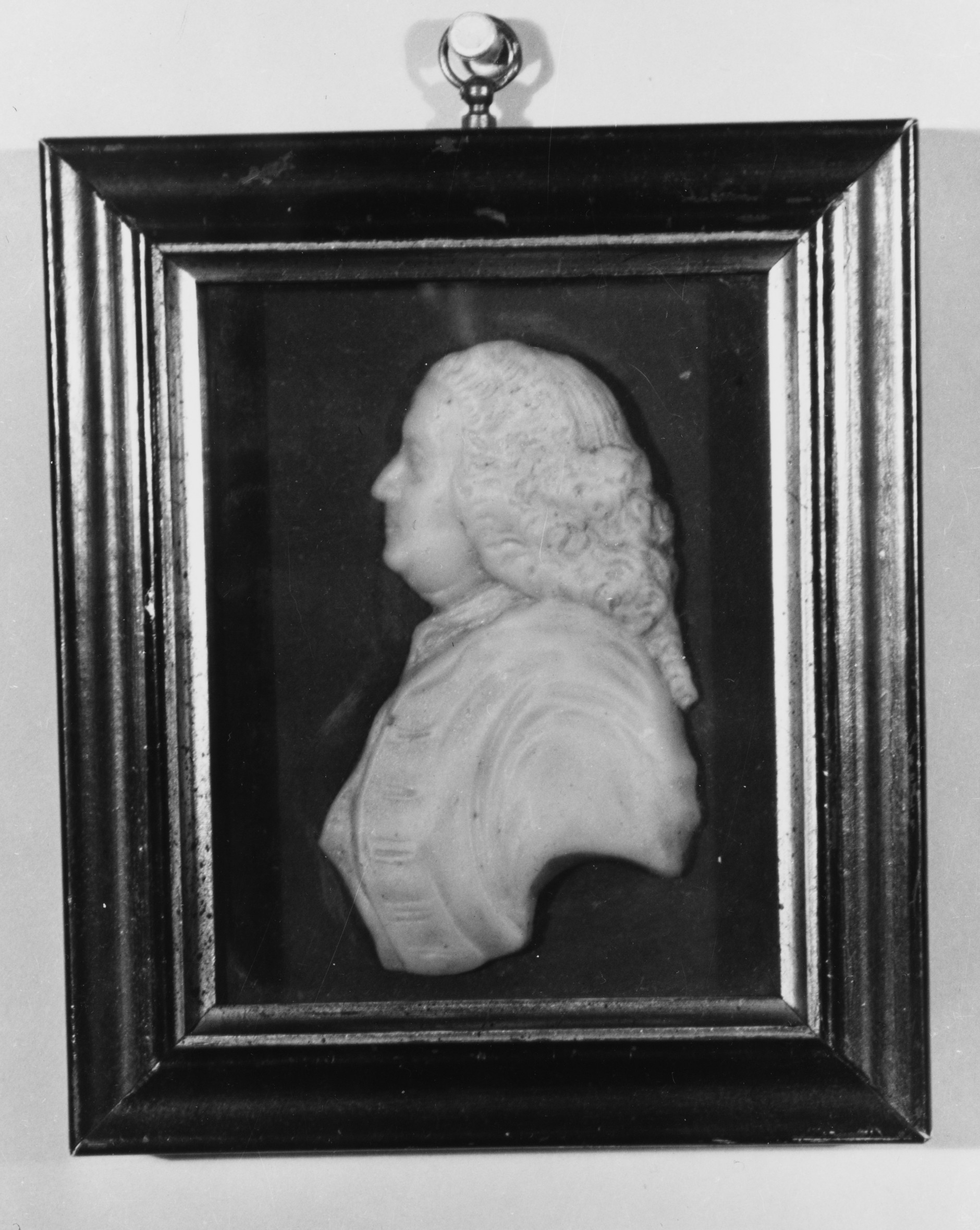
Wax bust of Benjamin Franklin by Patience Wright.

== Legacy ==
Wright's son Joseph Wright (1756–1793) was a well-known portrait painter who designed the Liberty Cap Cent. Her daughter Phoebe married British painter John Hoppner; their son, Henry Parkyns Hoppner, went on to become a Royal Navy officer and Arctic explorer.

Her home at 100 Farnsworth Avenue in Bordentown, New Jersey, still stands.

=== In literature ===
Wright was featured as a character in Lillian de la Torre's story "The Frantick Rebel," part of her series featuring Samuel Johnson as a detective, with Wright tricking Johnson into supplying information to an American spy.

In Season 2 of 'Turn: Washington's Spies, Patience Wright is seen scultping King George III, though her actress appears much younger than Wright would've been in 1777, 52. Wright is also murdered by the King's agents in the episode.
