= Höppner =

Hoeppner or Höppner is a German surname. Notable people with the surname include.

- Candice Bergen (politician)/Candice Hoeppner (re-assumed her birth name of Bergen; born 1964), Canadian politician
- Ernst von Höppner (1860–1922), German general
- Hans Höppner (1873–1946), German botanist and entomologist
- Jacob Höppner (1748–1826), Prussian Mennonite
- Jake Hoeppner (1936–2015), Canadian politician
- Manfred Höppner (1934–2023), German sports doctor
- Mareile Höppner (born 1977), German television presenter
- Michael Joseph Hoeppner (born 1949), American Roman Catholic bishop
- Reinhard Höppner (1948–2014), German politician
- Terry Hoeppner (1947–2007), American college football coach

== See also ==
- Hoppner (disambiguation)
- Hoepner
- de:Hoeppener
