= Höpner =

Hoepner or Höpner is a German surname. Notable people with the surname include.

- Christian Gottlob Höpner (1799–1859), German composer, organist and music educator
- Erich Hoepner (1886–1944), German general during World War II
- Janet Hopner (born 1936), Australian fencer
- Rolf-Heinz Höppner (1910–1998), German lawyer and Nazi SS-Obersturmbannführer

== See also ==
- Hoeppner
