= Joseph Wright (American painter) =

American painter

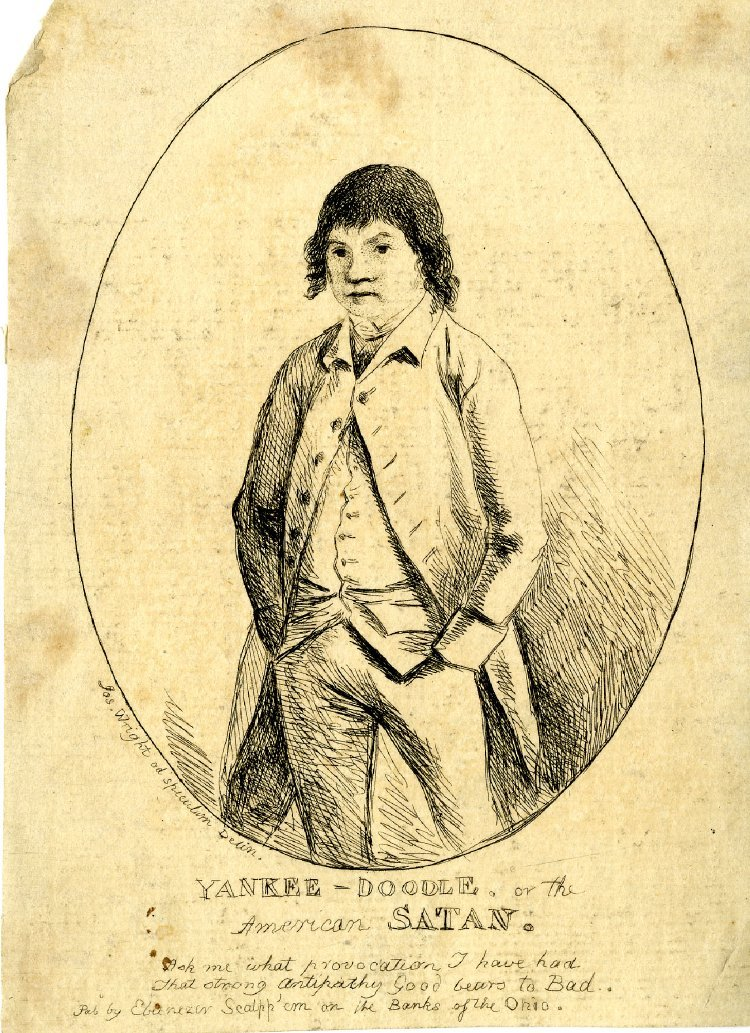
Yankee-Doodle, or the American Satan (1780), engraved self-portrait

Joseph Wright (July 16, 1756 – September 13, 1793) was an American painter and sculptor. He painted life portraits of George Washington and Benjamin Franklin, and was a designer of early U.S. coinage. Wright had been Washington's original choice for Chief Engraver of the United States Mint, but he died at age 37 before being confirmed to that position by the United States Congress. Wright is often confused with his contemporary, the English painter Joseph Wright of Derby.

== Early years ==
Wright was born in Bordentown, New Jersey, the son of Philadelphia barrelmaker Joseph Wright and sculptor Patience Lovell Wright. His parents were Quakers of English descent, and he attended the Academy and College of Philadelphia.

Wright's father died in 1769, and his mother turned her hobby of modeling wax portraits into a business. She opened a portrait studio/wax museum in New York City in 1770, leaving Wright in Philadelphia to finish his schooling. Patience Wright moved the portrait studio/wax museum to London in 1772, where she was joined by her children. Joseph Wright entered the Royal Academy of Arts in 1775, where he studied for six years, and in December 1778 won a silver medal for "the best model of an Academy figure." Wright caused a controversy at the school in 1780, by exhibiting a portrait of his mother modeling a wax head of King Charles II, while busts of King George III and Queen Charlotte looked on. Perhaps responding to accusations that he was anti-British, Wright engraved and published a cartoon self-portrait titled "Yankee-Doodle, or the American Satan." Wright was the first American-born student to matriculate from the Royal Academy of Arts.

== Portrait painter ==
=== Benjamin Franklin ===
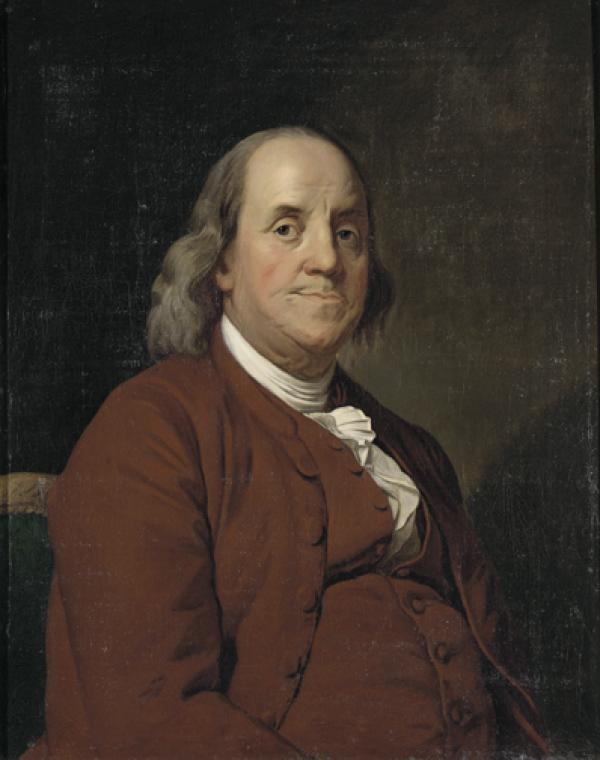
Portrait of Benjamin Franklin (1782), Pennsylvania Academy of the Fine Arts, Philadelphia

Patience Wright was a supporter of the American Revolution, and wartime tensions in London led to her move her portrait studio/wax museum to Paris in 1780. Her friend Benjamin Franklin came to Paris in 1782, as chief of the American delegation to negotiate a treaty to end the Revolutionary War. The chief of the British delegation, Richard Oswald, commissioned 26-year-old Joseph Wright to paint a portrait of Franklin. Rather than posing for many tedious hours, Franklin urged Wright to base his portrait on a small 1778 pastel portrait by French artist Joseph-Siffred Duplessis owned by Franklin. The pose was the same, but Wright's portrait was life-size, and he changed the clothing and background. Wright's correspondence confirms that Franklin indeed did sit for him. Franklin was pleased with the portrait, and commissioned Wright to paint a copy as a gift for a friend. Wright painted seven known versions of the portrait. The life portrait is in the Yale University Art Gallery, the "Franklin" replica is in the National Gallery of Art, and other replicas are in the Royal Society of London, (Note: One of three replicas painted for Caleb Whitefoord.) the Pennsylvania Academy of the Fine Arts, (Note: Likely the "Patience Wright" replica.) the Museum of Fine Arts Boston, (Note: Likely a replica for Richard Oswald's brother or nephew.) and elsewhere. (Note: In 1785, Duplessis painted a life-size oil-on-canvas version of Franklin in the same pose as his 1778 pastel, although in gray clothing (rather than brown). This caused Wright's Franklin portraits to be misattributed to Duplessis or other artists, and their 1782 dates to be questioned. The 1785 Duplessis portrait has been used on the United States one-hundred-dollar bill since 1914.)

Following seven years in Europe, Wright returned to America in 1782, with a letter of recommendation from Franklin to George Washington.

=== George Washington ===
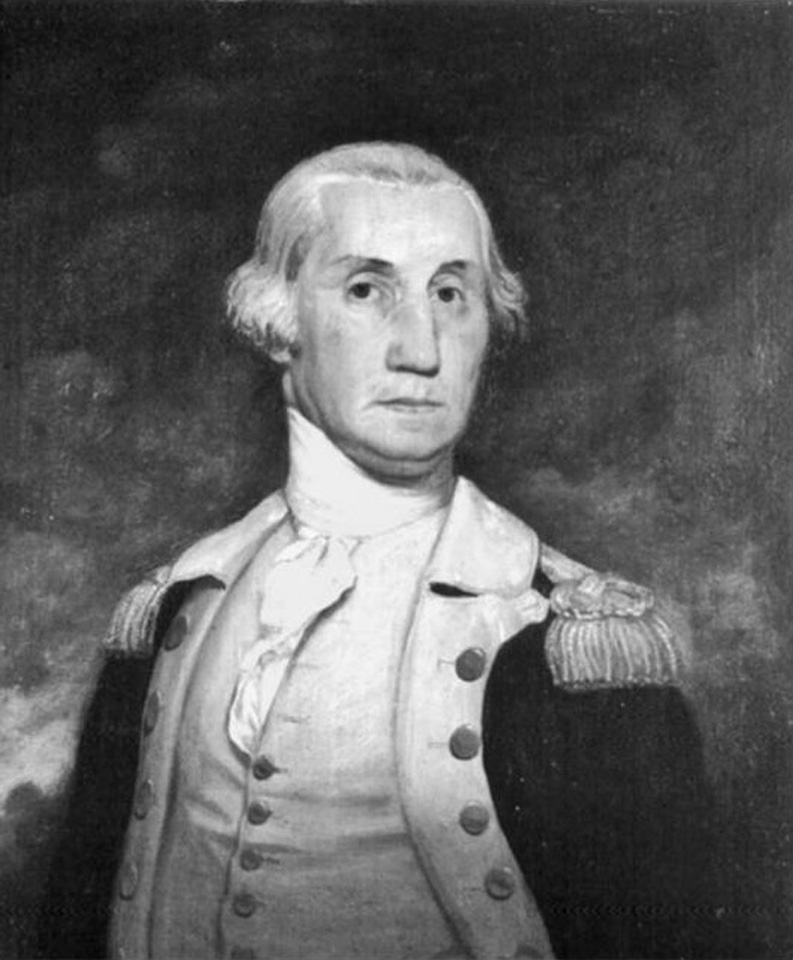
Life Study of George Washington (October 1783), Philadelphia History Museum

The Treaty of Paris was signed on September 3, 1783, officially ending the war. In October, Wright was one of two or three artists invited to Rocky Hill, New Jersey, to paint General Washington at his headquarters. (Note: William Dunlap also painted a portrait of Washington at Rocky Hill, now in the U.S. Senate collection.) Wright was granted a single sitting, and painted a 1/2-length study—oil on mahogany panel, 14 1/8 x 12 in. -- now in the collection of the Philadelphia History Museum. He based five known portraits on this life study, but there is no documentation that Washington granted additional sittings.

Washington received a letter from a Saxon nobleman, Friedrich-Christoph, Count de Solms, requesting that the American general sit for a portrait to add to the Count's portrait gallery of military leaders. The July 1783 letter took months to arrive, and was conveyed through the Saxon minister in London, who enclosed his own letter offering to pay for the portrait, and through Robert Morris. Washington spent two weeks in Philadelphia as Morris's houseguest in December 1783, during which he may have selected Wright to paint the portrait. (Note: William Spohn Baker argued (in 1898) that Washington probably commissioned the "Count de Solms" portrait from Wright during this Philadelphia stay, and potentially could have posed again for the artist.) He replied to the Count de Solms in January 1784: "I have not delayed a moment therefore to comply with your wishes, but have employed a Gentleman to perform the work, who is thought on a former occasion to have taken a better likeness of me, than any other painter has done: His forté seems to be in giving the distinguishing characteristics with more boldness than delicacy." Wright painted the 3/4-length portrait in Philadelphia, and completed it in early 1784. Washington returned to Philadelphia on May 1, for the first meeting of the Society of the Cincinnati, which convened from May 4 to 18. He may have seen the portrait for the first time on May 15, when he paid Wright $40 for it. Morris paid for the portrait to be shipped to London, and the Saxon minister sent it on to the Count de Solms.

Washington was pleased with the portrait, and commissioned Wright to paint a replica as a gift for Mrs. Samuel Powel. The "Powel" version—3/4-length, oil on canvas, 48 x 40 in—is in the Philadelphia History Museum. Thomas Jefferson saw the original portrait in Philadelphia, and also ordered a replica. (Note: On May 28, 1784, Jefferson left $40 (£17-10) with his friend Francis Hopkinson in Philadelphia, to pay Wright for the portrait.) He was soon to depart for Paris, to represent the United States in treaty negotiations between France and Great Britain. Wright was only able to finish the head and to sketch out the body before the portrait sailed with Jefferson. American painter John Trumbull was in Paris in 1786, and Jefferson hired him to complete the portrait. (Note: The Wright/Trumbull version shows Washington holding the scabbard of his sword in his left hand. Wright's other 3/4-length versions show Washington holding the scabbard in his right hand and his hat in his left.) The Wright/Trumbull version later hung at Monticello, and is now at the Massachusetts Historical Society. A seated portrait of Washington by Wright is at the Connecticut State Library and Supreme Court Building, in Hartford. A head-and-bust portrait, missing the background battlefield scene of the 3/4-length versions, is at Mount Vernon. The Count de Solms acknowledged receipt of the original portrait in a 1785 letter, but its current whereabouts are unknown.

==== Busts ====
On August 7, 1783, Congress created a committee to commission a life-size bronze equestrian statue of George Washington to adorn the eventual U.S. national capital. The committee's recommendation specified: "The general to be represented in a Roman dress, holding a truncheon in his right hand, and his head encircled with a laurel-wreath." It directed that the statue be modeled and cast in Europe, but also commissioned Wright to create a life-size clay bust of Washington to be used as a 3-dimensional model by whatever European sculptor should be awarded the equestrian commission. In furtherance of this effort, Washington invited Wright to Mount Venon, and allowed the artist to make a life mask of his face:

Wright came to Mount Vernon with the singular request that I should permit him to take a model of my face, in plaster of Paris, to which I consented, with some reluctance. He oiled my features over; and placing me flat upon my back, upon a cot, preceded to daub my face with the plaster. Whilst in this ludicrous attitude, Mrs. Washington entered the room; and seeing, my face thus overspread with the plaster, involuntarily exclaimed. Her cry excited me in a disposition to smile, which gave my mouth a slight twist, or compression of the lips that is now observable in the bust which Wright afterward made.

Wright's clay bust may have been nearing completion in late 1783, when Patience Wright, then back in London, wrote to Washington in December: "My Friends Write to me from America that Joseph Wright (my Son) has painted a Likeness and also moddel'd (sic) a Clay Busto of General Washington which will be a very great honor to My Famaly (sic)." In April 1784, the Congressional committee paid Wright $233.33 for the clay bust. But it provided no funding for the bust to be transported to France for the U.S. Minister to the Court of Versailles, Benjamin Franklin, to select a sculptor. Instead, the bust was delivered to Congress, then meeting at Trenton, New Jersey. The idea of commissioning a bronze equestrian statue of Washington seems to have been abandoned during the French Revolution. Wright's clay bust is presumed to have been destroyed by the British during the War of 1812, in the August 1814 burning of the U.S. Capitol.

Congress also commissioned Wright to model a life-size plaster relief bust of Washington, that he completed in January 1785. He created a half-size plaster version of this for Martha Washington, that remains at Mount Vernon. He modeled at least two profile relief heads in wax, that are now at Mount Vernon and the Winterthur Museum in Delaware. Wright painted a c.1790 profile bust of Washington in uniform, which he engraved and published as a print. Thomas Jefferson judged Wright's engraving very highly: "I have no hesitation in pronouncing Wright's drawing to be a better likeness of the General than [Charles Willson] Peale's."

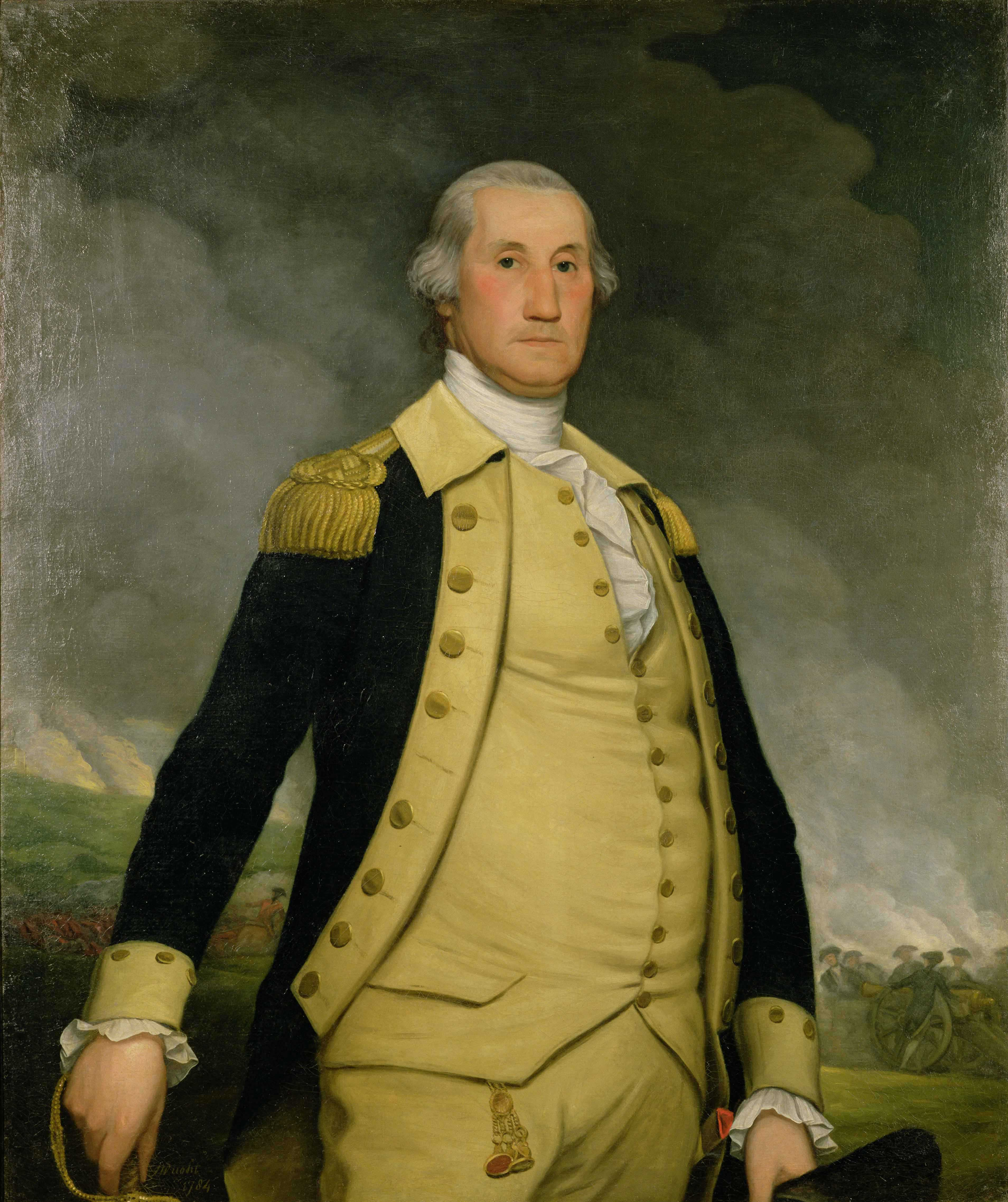
Powel Portrait of George Washington (1784), Philadelphia History Museum

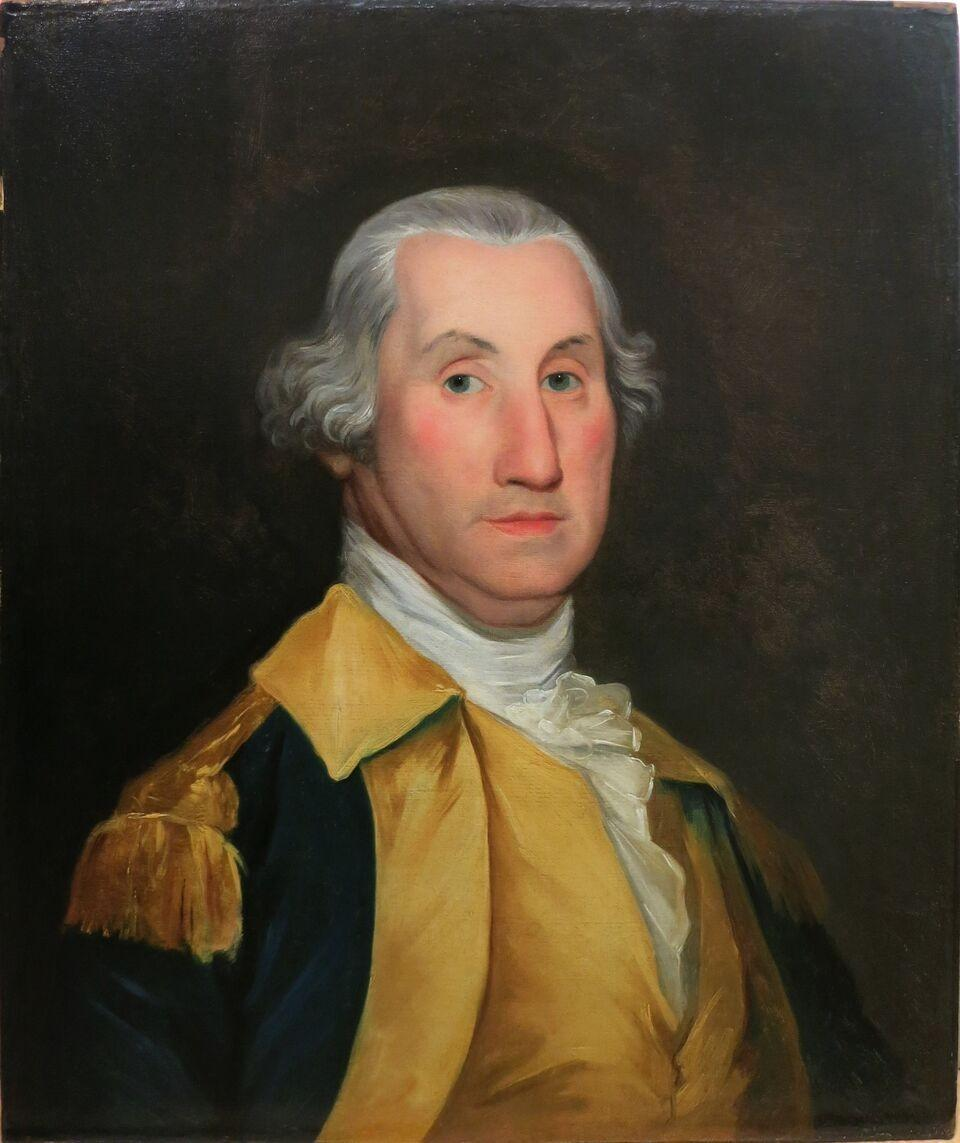
Portrait of George Washington (1784), Mount Vernon, VA

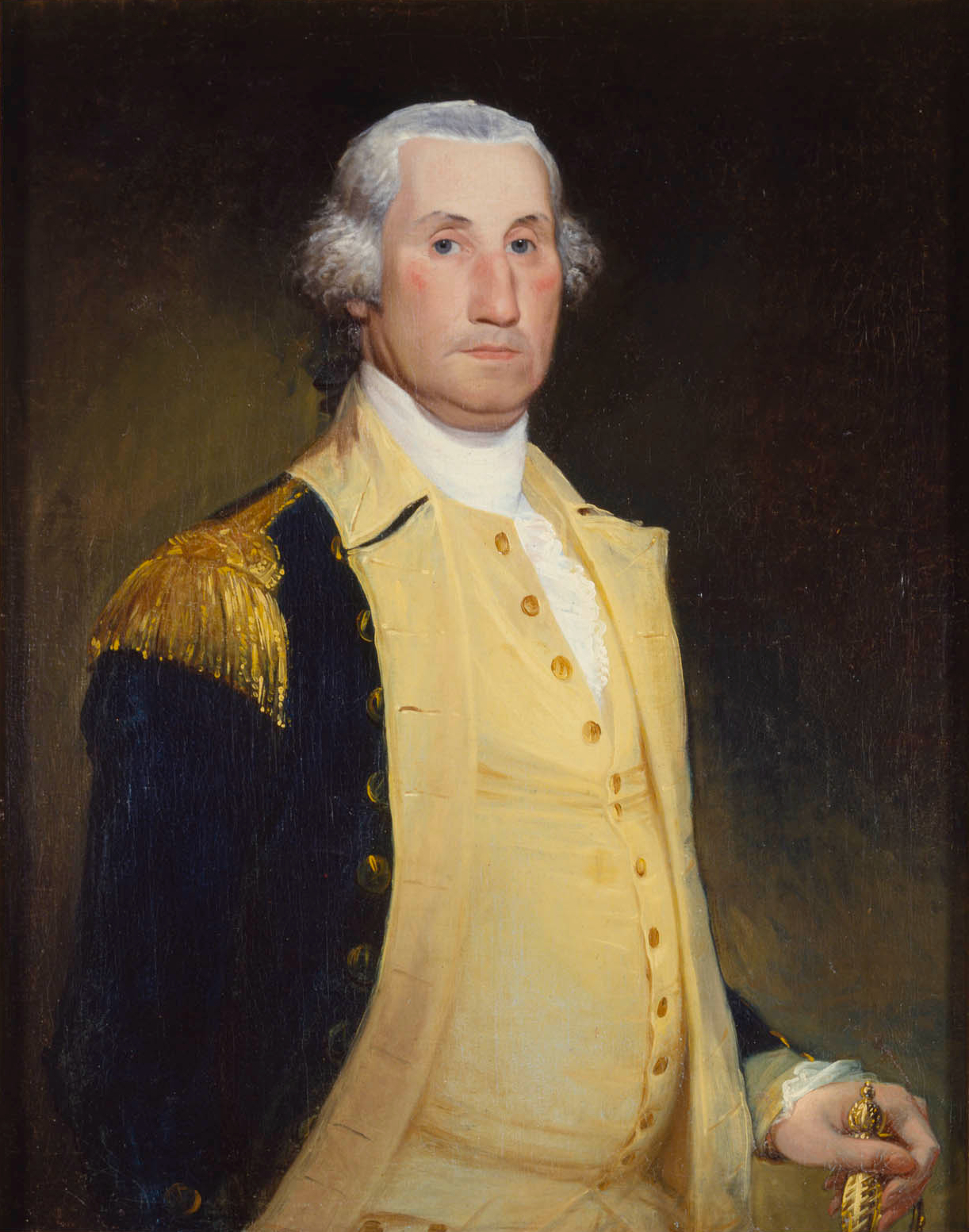
Wright-Trumbull Portrait of George Washington (1784; additions by John Trumbull, 1786), Massachusetts Historical Society, Boston

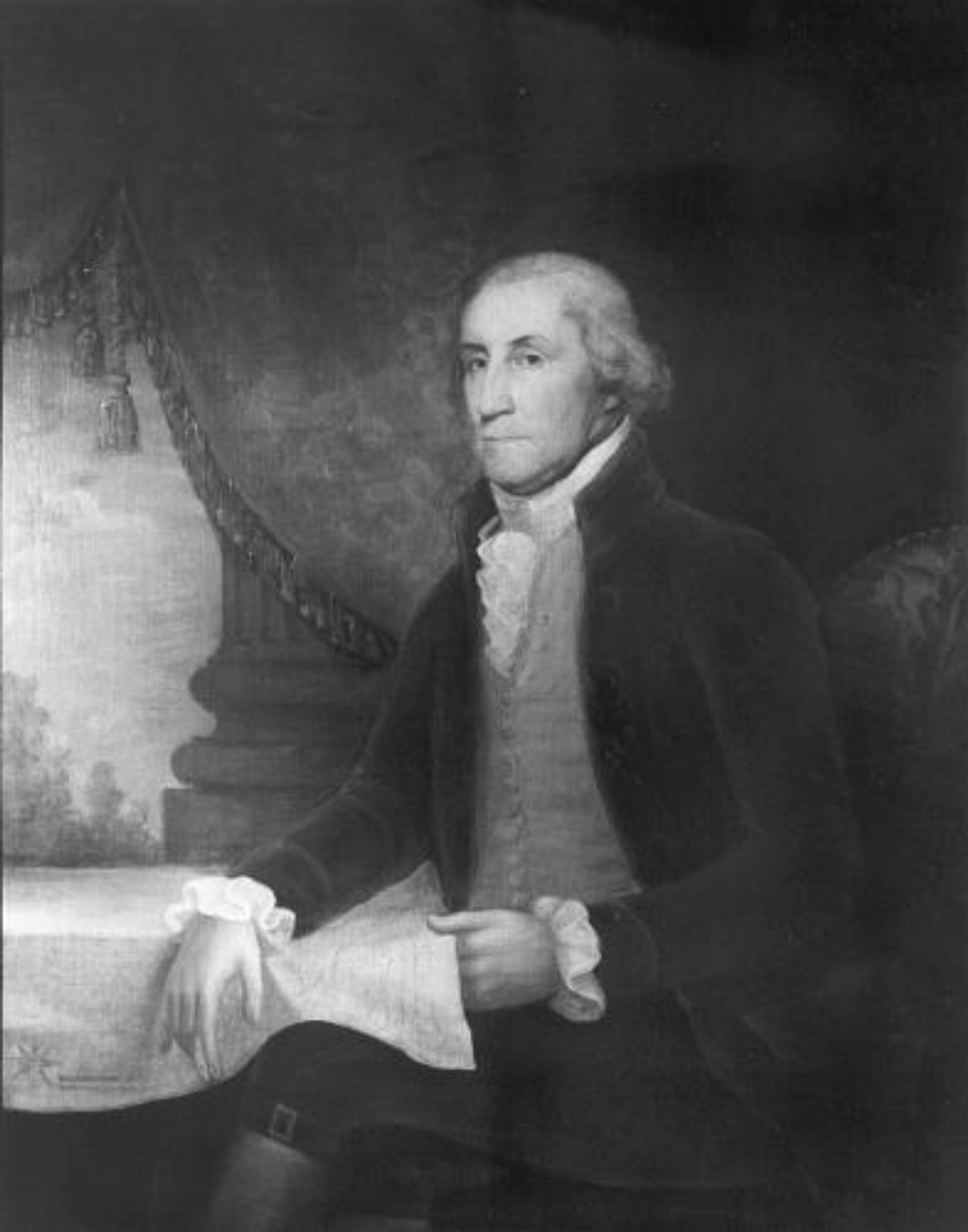
Seated Portrait of George Washington (c.1789-1790), Museum of Connecticut History, Hartford

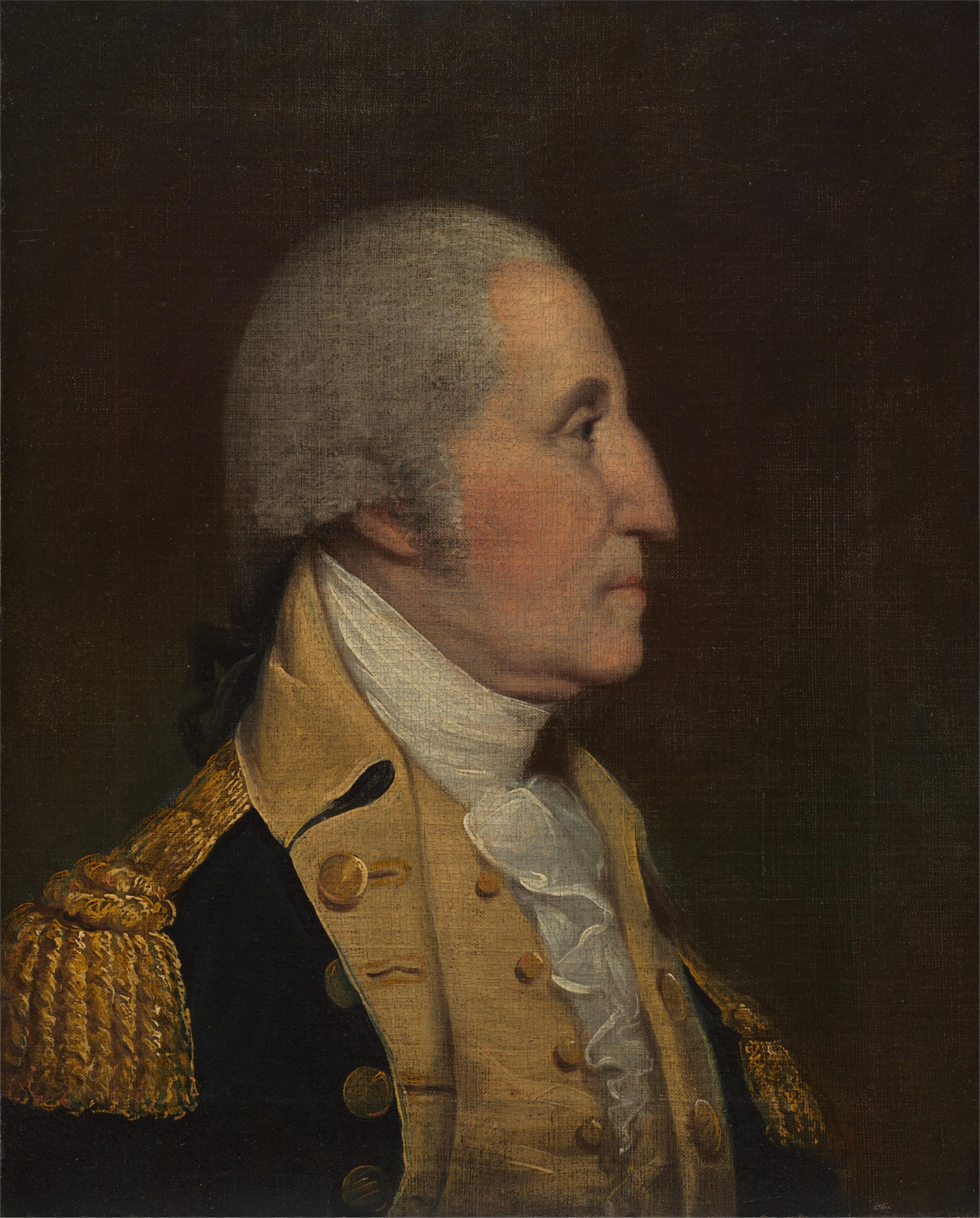
Profile Portrait of George Washington (1790), Cleveland Museum of Art

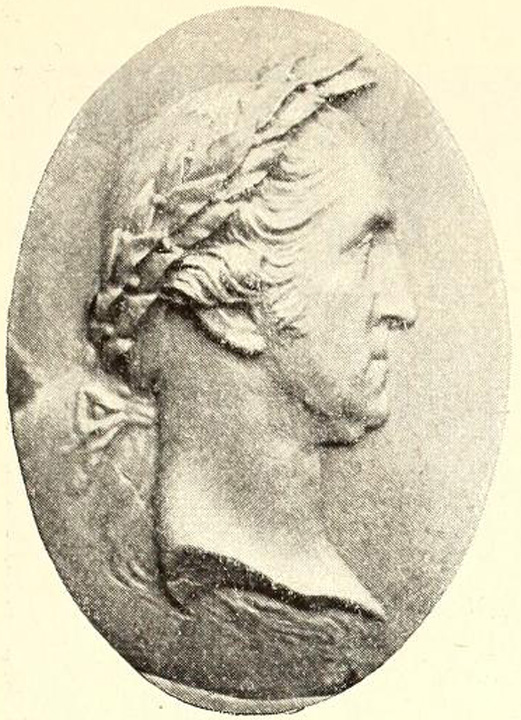
Wax relief head of George Washington (c.1784), Winterthur Museum, Wilmington, DE

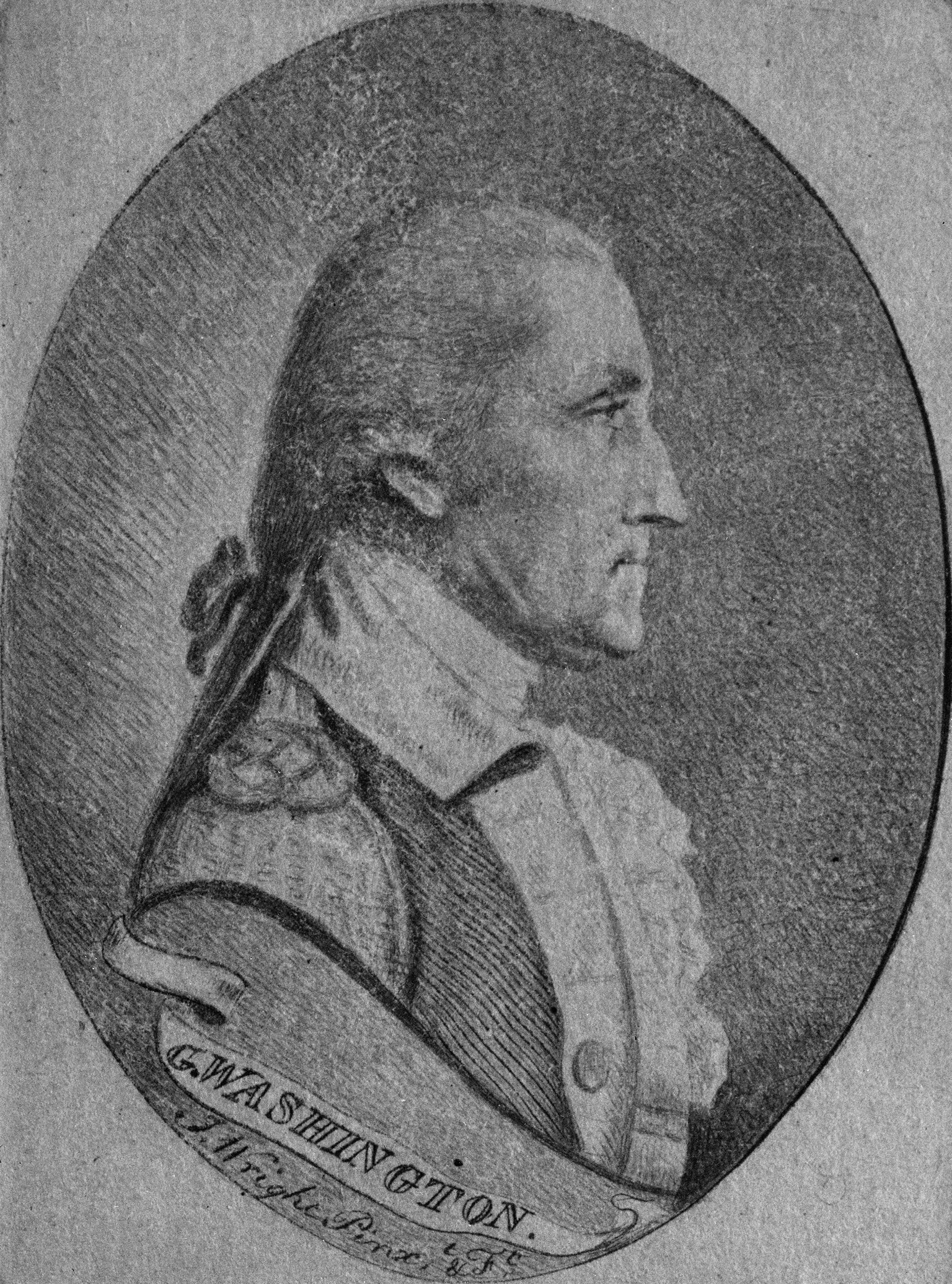
Engraved bust of G. Washington (1790), Metropolitan Museum of Art

=== Other portraits ===
Wright moved his portrait studio to New York City in 1786. Two years later the city became the first national capital under the U.S. Constitution.

Wright's Portrait of Frederick Muhlenberg (1790), is the only known image of the first Speaker of the U.S. House of Representatives. It is also the only known image of the interior of Federal Hall, where both houses of Congress met, 1788–1790. New York City served as the national capital for two years, and the portrait shows Muhlenberg seated at his desk on the dais of the House Chamber. Wright later painted a pendant portrait of Muhlenberg's wife, and the two portraits hung in their family home in Trappe, Pennsylvania. That home is now a house museum, where Mrs. Muhlenberg's portrait hangs alongside a 19th-century copy after Wright's Speaker Muhlenberg portrait. The original portrait is now in the National Portrait Gallery, and an 1881 copy by Samuel Bell Waugh is in the U.S. House of Representatives art collection.

Wright painted pendant portraits of Charles Thomson, secretary of the Continental Congress, 1774–1789, and his second wife, Hannah Harrison.

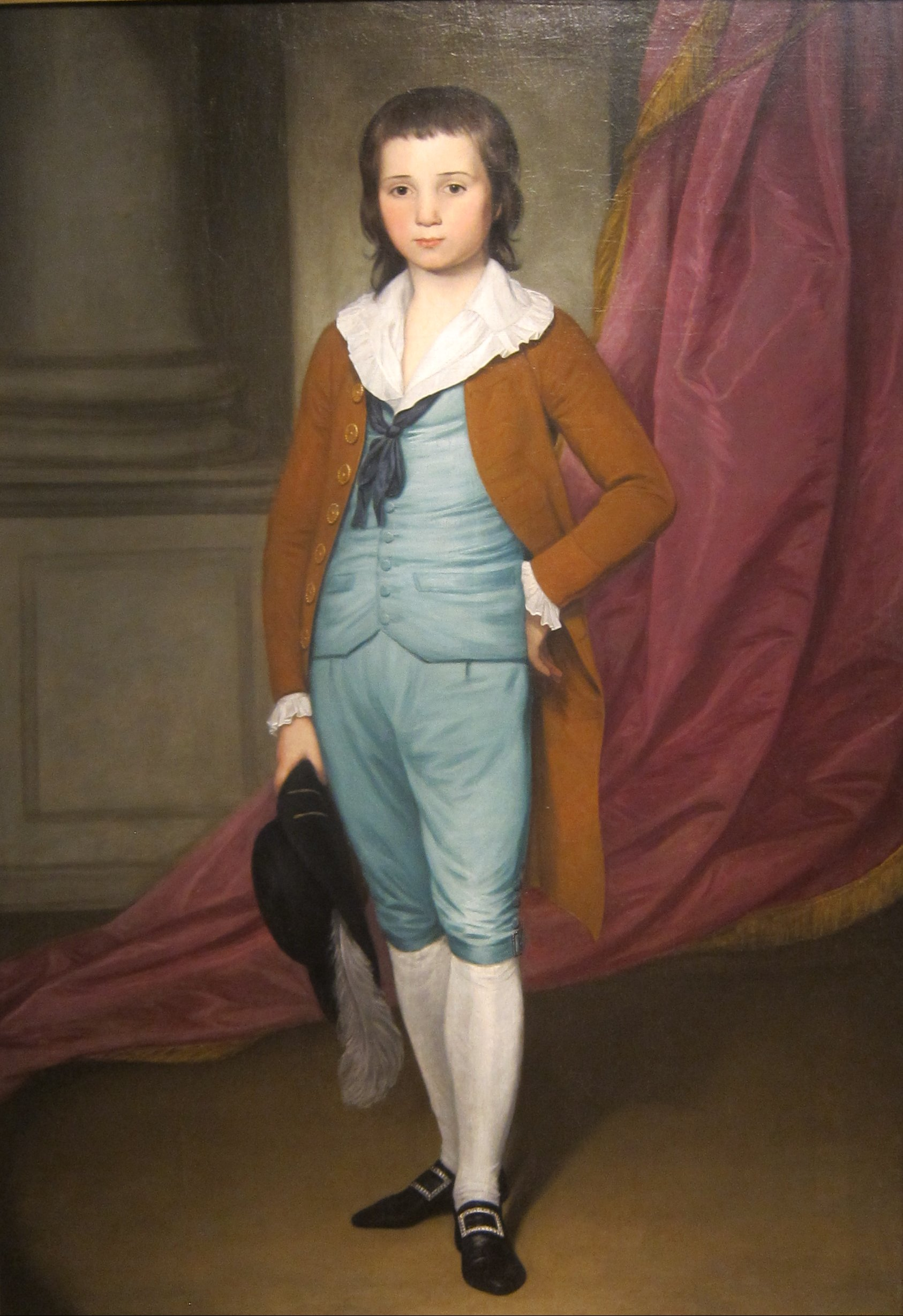
Portrait of John Coats Browne (c.1784), de Young Museum of Art, San Francisco, CA

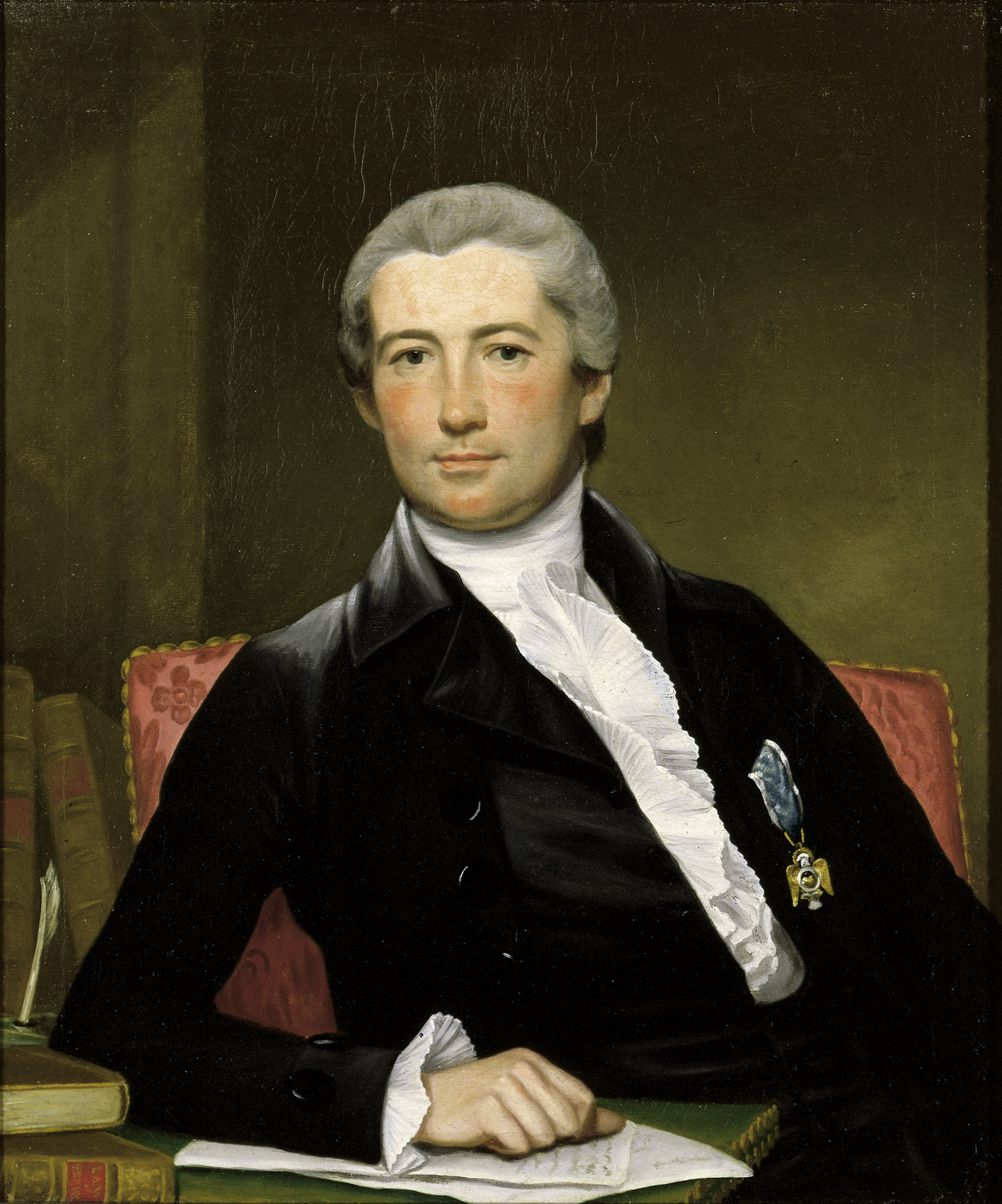
Portrait of General James Giles (c.1785), Smithsonian American Art Museum, Washington, D.C.

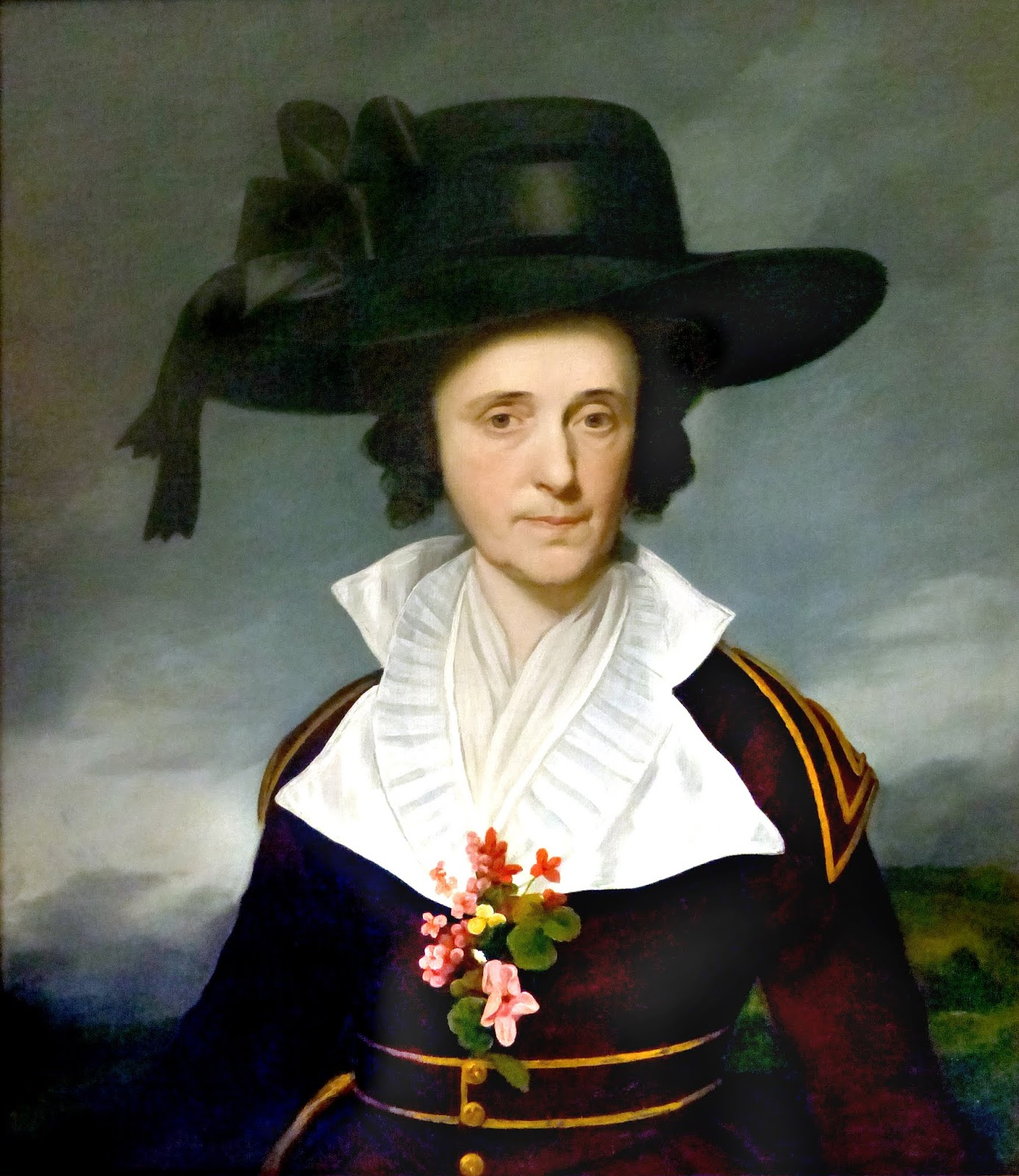
Portrait of Hannah Harrison Thompson (c.1785), Tudor Place, Washington, D.C.

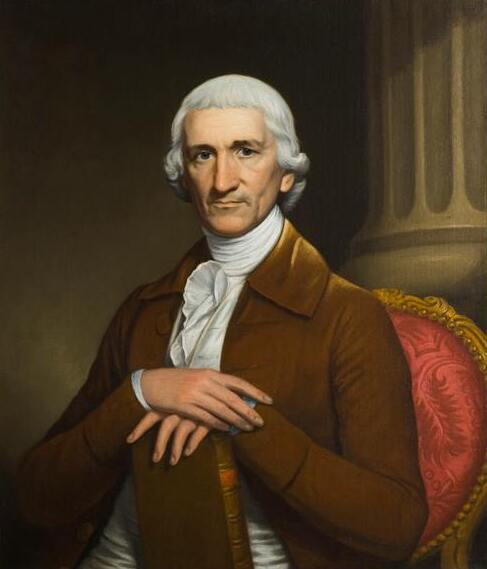
Portrait of Charles Thomson (c.1785), Tudor Place, Washington, D.C.

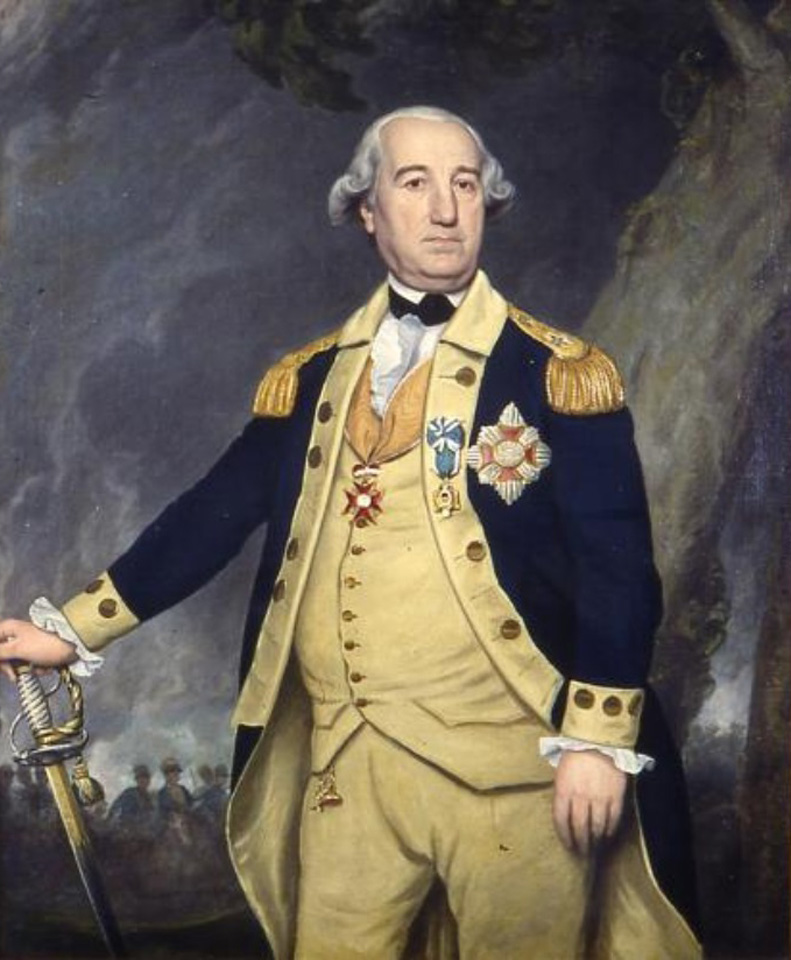
Portrait of Baron von Steuben (c.1786), National Portrait Gallery, Washington, D.C.

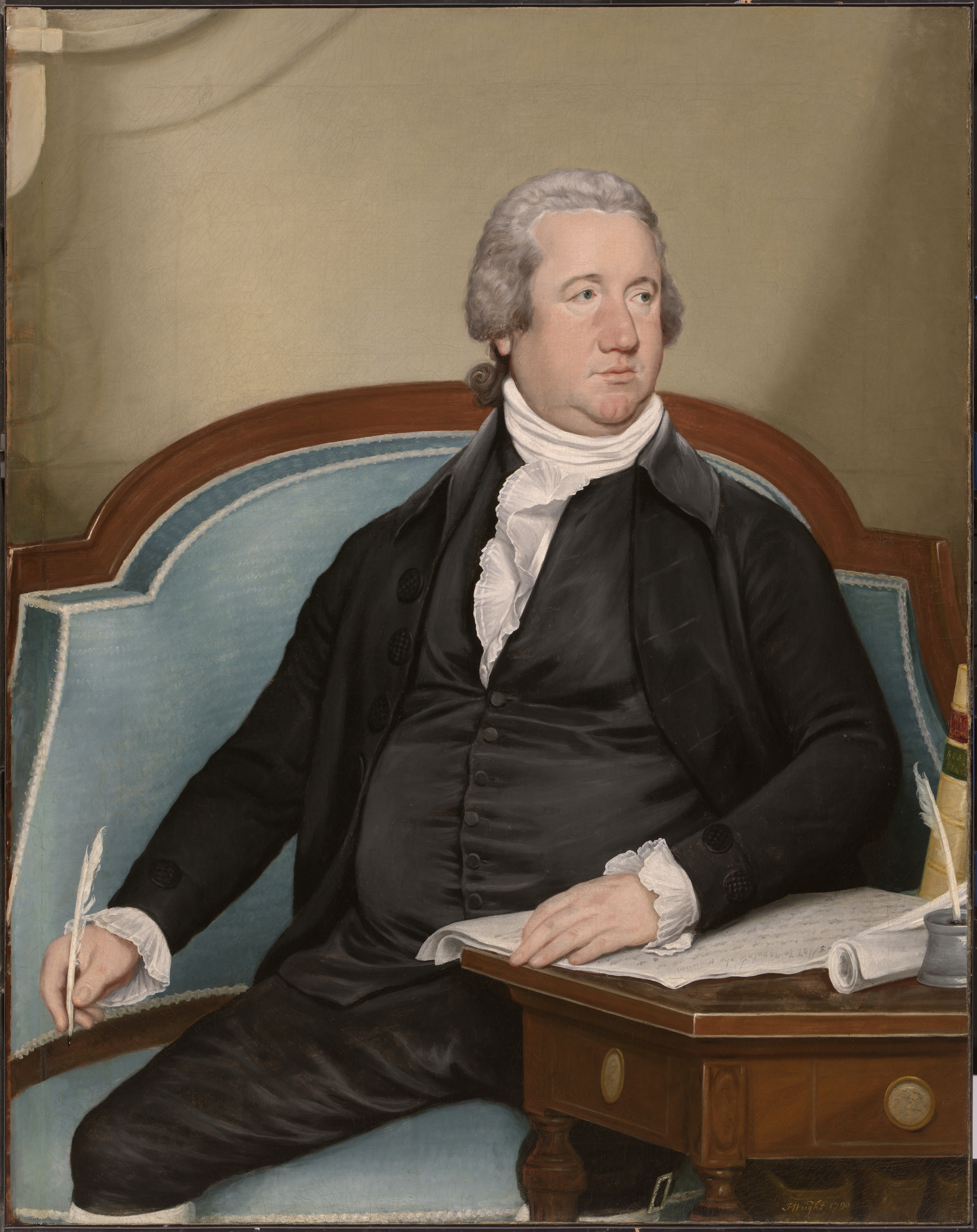
Portrait of Frederick Augustus Conrad Muhlenberg (1790), National Portrait Gallery, Washington, D.C.

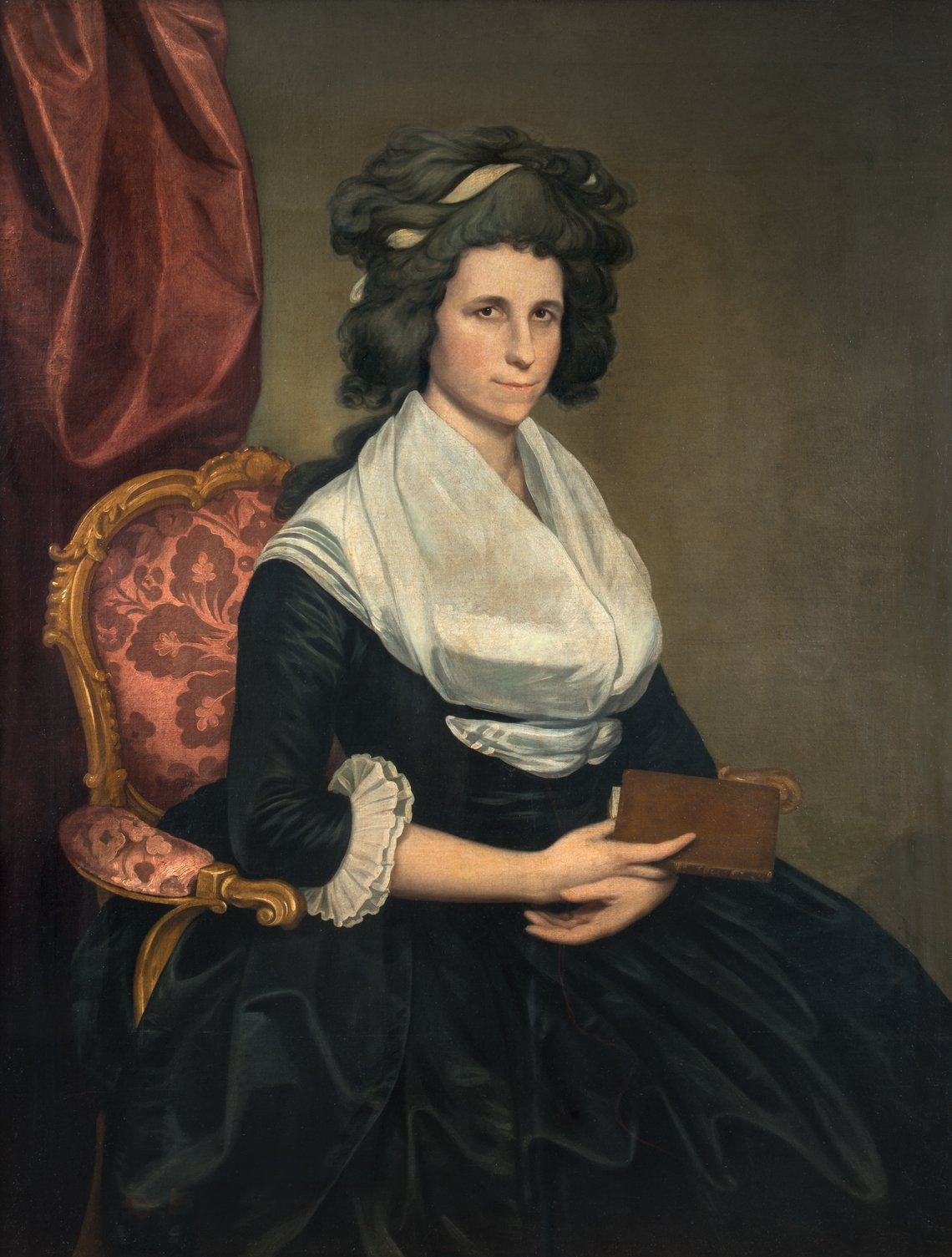
Portrait of Catharine Schaeffer Muhlenberg (c.1790), on loan to The Speaker's House, Trappe, PA

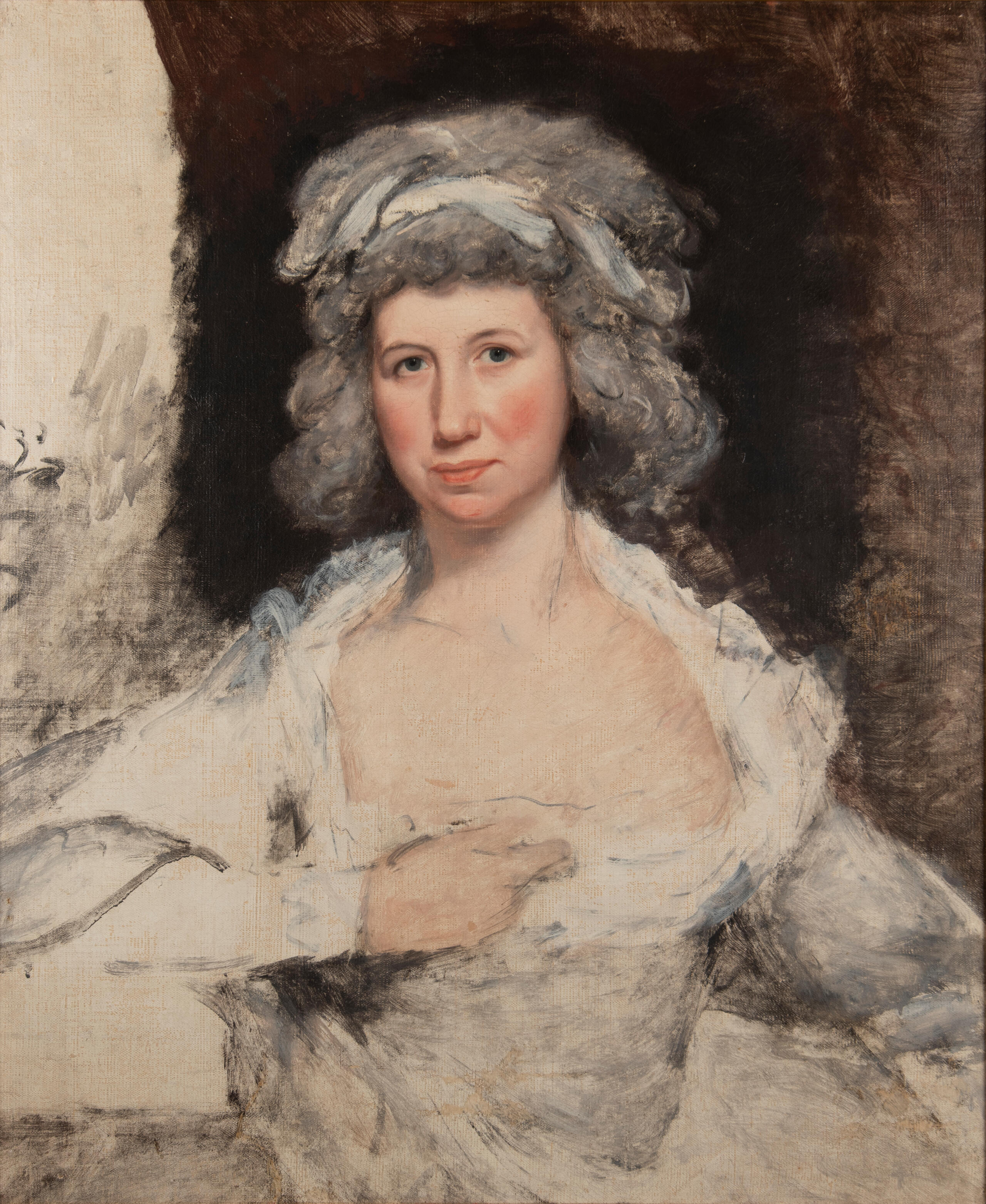
Portrait of Elizabeth Willing Powel (c.1793), Mount Vernon, VA

== U.S. coinage ==
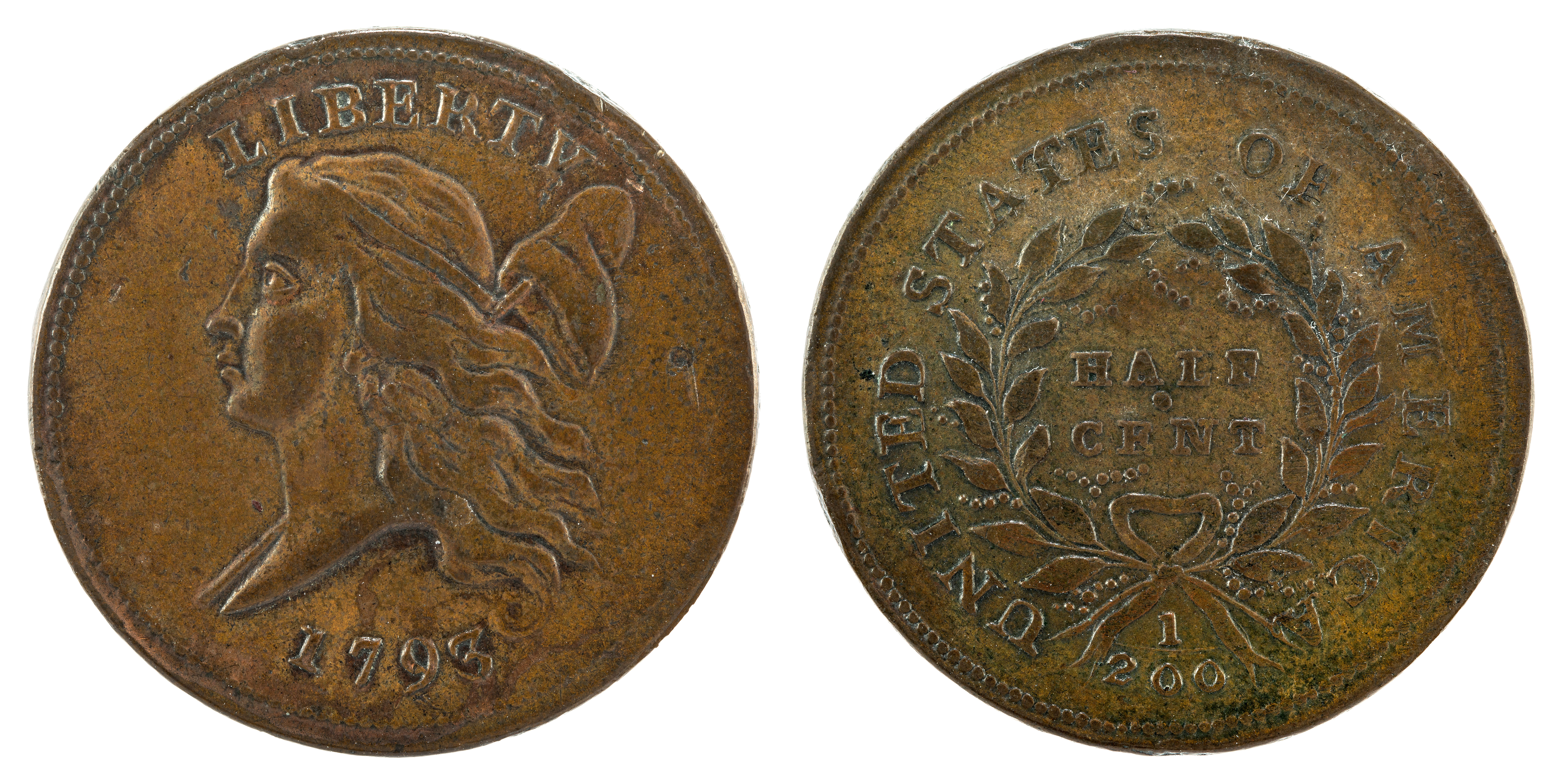
Liberty Cap Half Cent (1793)

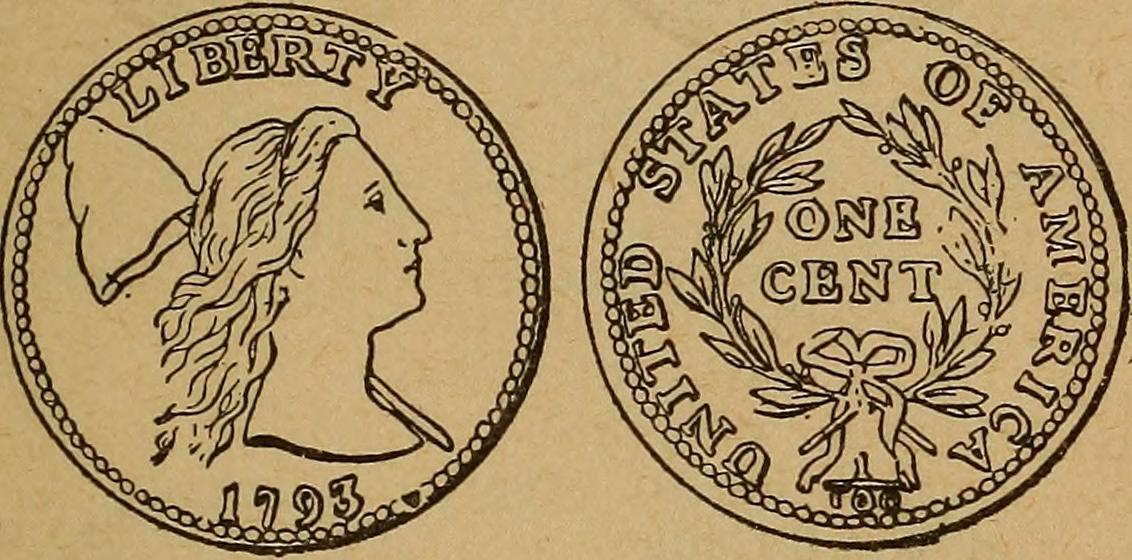
Liberty Cap Large Cent (1793)

Early in his presidency, Washington and Secretary of State Thomas Jefferson diligently sought expert European engravers to design the first United States coins. These attempts were unsuccessful, and Wright was working as the unofficial engraver at the U.S. Mint by late 1792. He was designated as the Mint's "First Draughtsman & Diesinker" in August 1793, but Wright died the following month.

Wright designed the Liberty Cap Half-Cent and the Liberty Cap Large Cent. Both coins feature the Goddess of Liberty holding a pole over her shoulder with a liberty cap hanging off the end of it, but she faces left on the half-cent, and faces right on the large cent. The Liberty image first appeared as the obverse of the General Henry Lee Medal (1792), commissioned by Congress, issued by the Mint, and signed "J. Wright." There is debate about whether Wright or Henry Voigt engraved the dies for these coins, although most historians and numismatists today credit the 1793 dies to Wright. Wright also designed the 1792 Quarter dollar and engraved the dies for it, but that coin was never issued.

== Personal ==
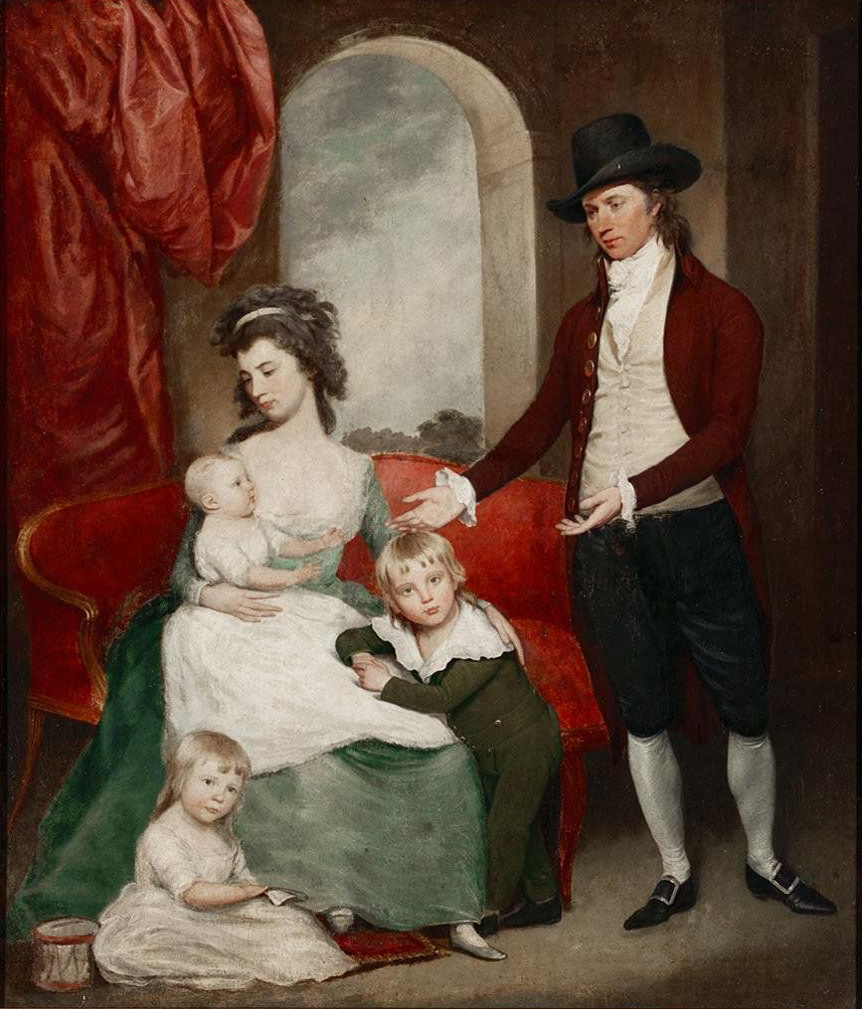
The Wright Family (1793, unfinished), Pennsylvania Academy of the Fine Arts, Philadelphia

Wright's sister Phoebe married his schoolmate from the Royal Academy of Arts, British portrait painter John Hoppner.

On December 5, 1789, Wright married Sarah Vandervoordt in Philadelphia. They had three children, Sarah, Joseph, and Harriet.

Wright moved his portrait studio back to Philadelphia in 1791. Congress had designated the city as the temporary national capital for a 10-year period, 1790–1800, while the permanent national capital was under construction. Wright took on the wood-carver William Rush as a student, teaching him to model in clay.

In Summer 1793, Wright began a family portrait depicting himself, his wife and their three young children. Yellow fever was raging through Philadelphia by July, and they sent the children to live with relatives to protect them. Wright caught yellow fever and died on September 13; his wife died days later. Although orphaned, all three children survived.
