= Hoppner River =

Coordinates: 68°58′37″N 117°43′50″W

- Location of Mouth

Location
- Country: Canada
- Territory: Nunavut

Physical characteristics
- Mouth
  - location: Dolphin and Union Strait/ Amundsen Gulf
- Length: >70 km (43 mi)

The Hoppner River flows northward from Wollaston Peninsula (previously referred to as Wollaston Land) into Dolphin and Union Strait at the juncture with the Amundsen Gulf in Nunavut, Canada. Long-tailed duck (Harelda glacialis) frequent the area.

The river is one of several landforms named in honour of Royal Navy officer and Arctic explorer Henry Parkyns Hoppner who charted the region during William Edward Parry's First, Second, and Third Arctic Expeditions.

== See also ==
- List of rivers of Nunavut
