= Cape Hoppner =

Land point on Melville Island, Canada

Coordinates: 74°59′2″N 112°52′8″W

Cape Hoppner is a land point on Melville Island, Northwest Territories, Canada. It juts into the southern section of Liddon Gulf across from Barry Bay.

The cape was named in honor of the Royal Navy officer and Arctic explorer Henry Parkyns Hoppner.
