= Portrait of Frederick Muhlenberg =

1790 painting by Joseph Wright

Frederick Augustus Conrad Muhlenberg
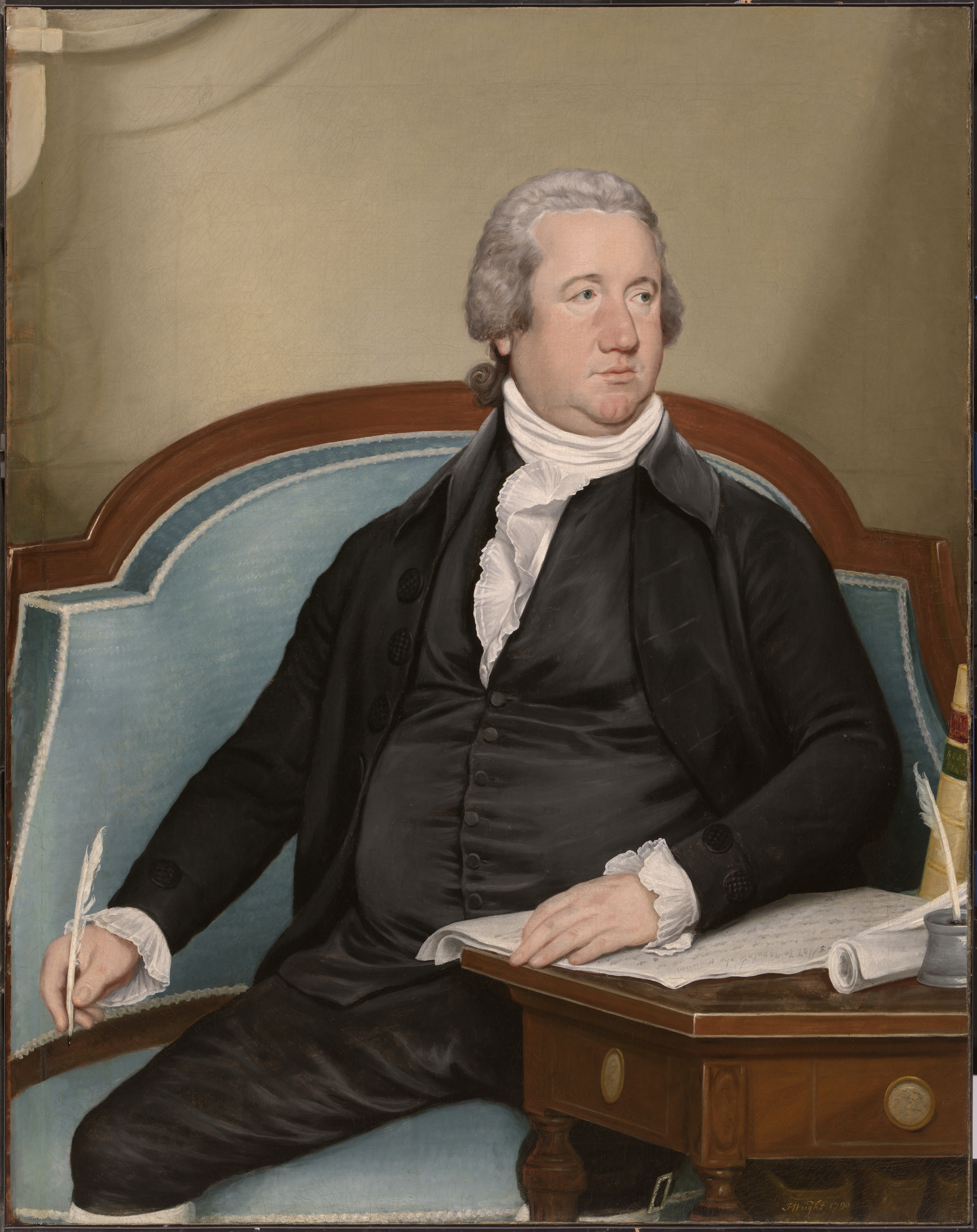
- Artist: Joseph Wright
- Year: 1790
- Medium: Oil on canvas
- Dimensions: 47 1/16 x 37 in (119.54 x 94 cm)
- Location: National Portrait Gallery, Washington, D.C.

Frederick Augustus Conrad Muhlenberg is a portrait of 1790 by Joseph Wright, now in the collection of the National Portrait Gallery. It depicts Muhlenberg in his position as the first Speaker of the U.S. House of Representatives.

== Sitter ==
Frederick Muhlenberg (1750, Trappe, Pennsylvania – 1801, Lancaster, Pennsylvania) was a Pennsylvania minister and politician. He was educated in Germany, and graduated from the University of Halle (Universität Halle). He was ordained a Lutheran minister in Pennsylvania in 1770, and served as pastor for churches in southeastern Pennsylvania and New York City.

He served as a representative from Pennsylvania to the Continental Congress in 1779 and 1780, and as Speaker of the Pennsylvania Provincial Assembly from 1780 to 1783. He was elected Chairman of the Pennsylvania State Constitutional Convention, which ratified the U.S. Constitution on December 11, 1787. Eleven of the thirteen states had ratified the document by summer 1788—more than a three-quarters majority—and Congress Under the Articles of Confederation certified the U.S. Constitution on September 3, 1788. Pennsylvania held a U.S. Congressional election on November 26, 1788, and Muhlenberg was elected to the Pennsylvania delegation. The newly-created First U.S. Congress convened in New York City on March 4, 1789. On April 1, 1789, its members elected Muhlenberg the first Speaker of the House, a position he held until the Second U.S. Congress was sworn in on March 4, 1791.

Muhlenberg served four consecutive terms in Congress, and also was elected the third Speaker of the House, a position he held from December 2, 1793 to March 4, 1795. He chose not to run for a fifth term, and retired from Congress on March 4, 1797.

== Portrait ==
Joseph Wright (1756, Bordentown, New Jersey – 1793, Philadelphia, Pennsylvania) was a portrait painter who worked in Philadelphia and New York City. He studied under Benjamin West and John Hoppner in London, and was the first American to graduate from the Royal Academy of Arts. He painted several life portraits of Benjamin Franklin in Paris, and returned to America in 1782 with a glowing recommendation from Franklin. He painted five life portraits of General George Washington in uniform, was commissioned by Congress to model a bust of Washington, and designed early U.S. coinage.

Muhlenberg commissioned Wright to paint his portrait. It depicts him seated in the Speaker's chair at Federal Hall in New York City, holding a quill pen and in the process of signing House Bill 65, "An Act to regulate Trade and Intercourse with the Indian Tribes," which Muhlenberg signed on July 20, 1790. Wright is presumed to have painted the portrait in New York City, either toward the end of the First Congress's Second Session (January 4, 1790 – August 12, 1790) or in the recess between the Second and Third Sessions. The Speaker's portrait is the only known life image of Frederick Muhlenberg, and the only known image of the interior of Federal Hall.

The Speaker's portrait descended through the Muhlenberg family, and was owned by "the family of Mrs. George Brooke, of Birdsboro, Pa." in 1910. It was passed down to her elder son, Edward Brooke II, in 1912; then passed down to his eldest son, George Brooke III, in 1940. George Brooke III married a cousin, who was also a descendant of Frederick Muhlenberg. Virginia Muhlenberg Brooke (his widow) lent the Speaker's portrait to the National Portrait Gallery in 1968, for its inaugural exhibition in the Old Patent Office Building. The National Portrait Gallery purchased it from her in 1974.

=== Copies ===
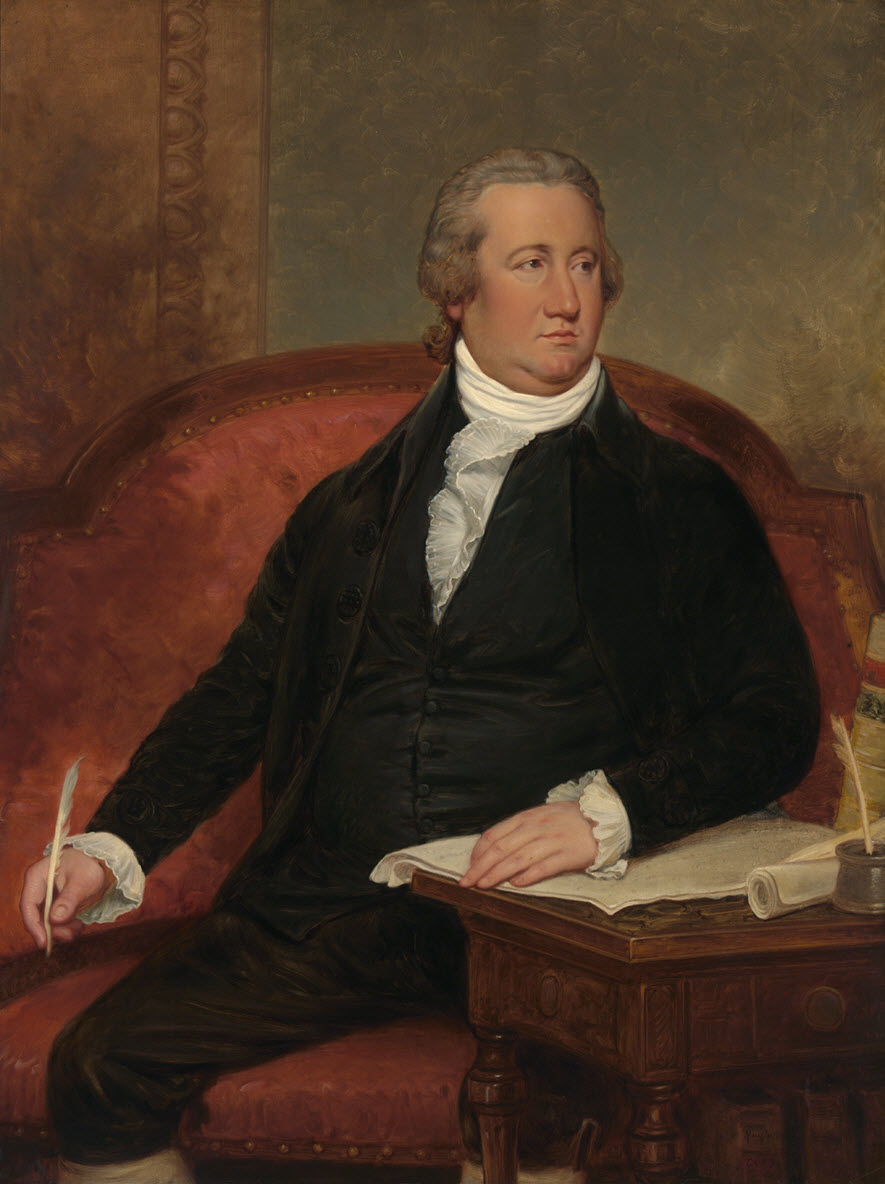
Samuel Bell Waugh, Frederick Augustus Conrad Muhlenberg (1881, after Joseph Wright), U.S. Capitol, Washington, D.C.

Pennsylvania commissioned Samuel Bell Waugh to paint a copy of Wright's Frederick Muhlenberg portrait for the U.S. Capitol. The artist changed the color of the Speaker's chair upholstery, changed the portrait's background, and gave Muhlenberg a ruddy complexion. Waugh's copy was donated to the U.S. House of Representatives in 1881. It hangs in the Speaker's Lobby, just outside the Speaker's Office.

The Speaker's House Museum in Trappe, Pennsylvania owns a circa-1838 copy of Wright's Frederick Muhlenberg portrait. Unsigned, but attributed to artist Jacob Eichholtz, it was donated to the museum by a Muhlenberg descendant in 2007.

== Pendant portrait ==
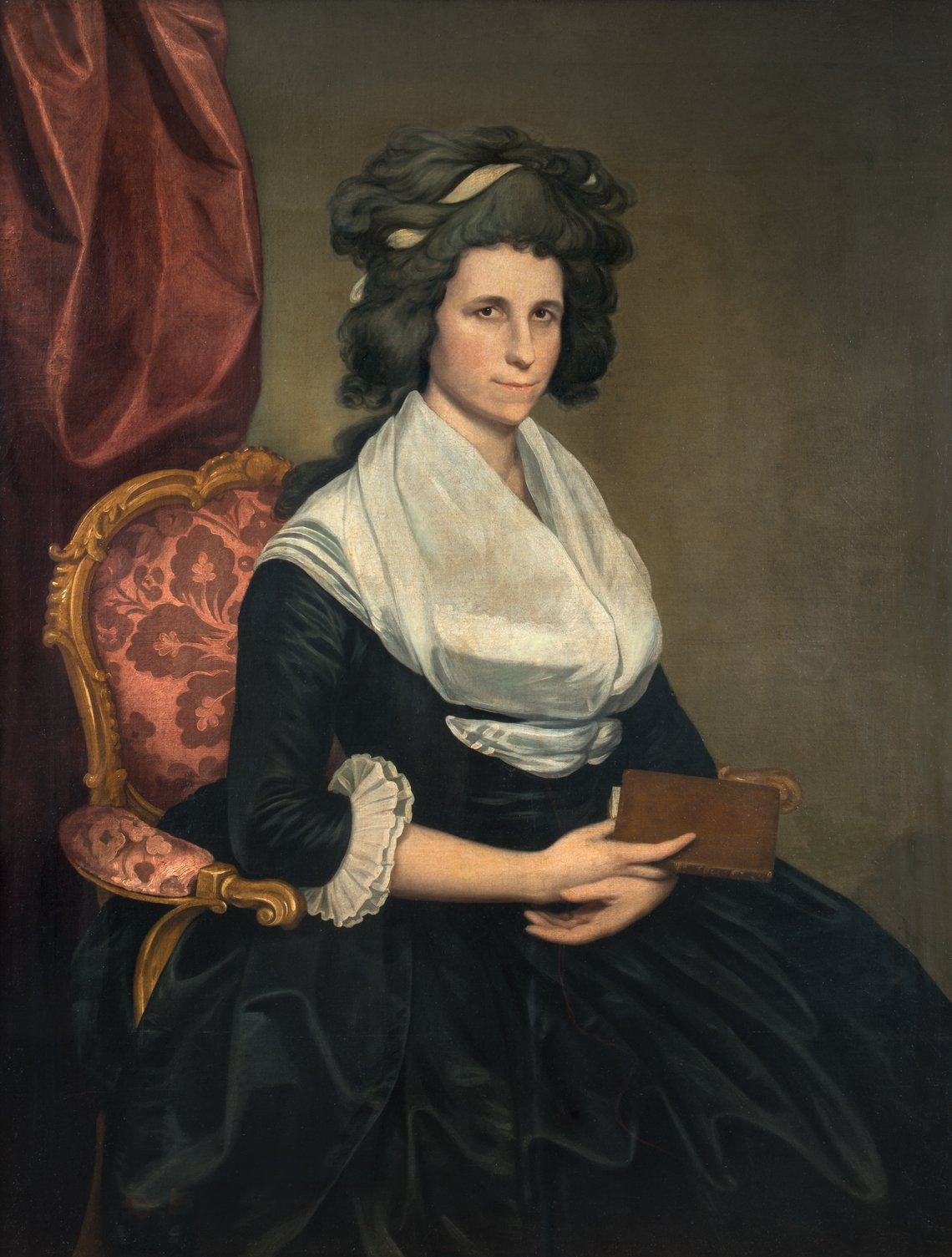
Joseph Wright, Catharine Schaeffer Muhlenberg (c. 1790), The Speaker's House Museum, Trappe, Pennsylvania.

Muhlenberg also commissioned Wright to paint a pendant portrait of his wife, Catharine Schaeffer Muhlenberg. This followed the same line of descent as the Speaker's portrait, owned by the family of Mrs. George Brooke in 1910. "Brookewood," the George Brooke mansion in Birdsboro, burned on Christmas Day, 1917. The pendant portrait had remained unpublished since 1910, and scholar Monroe H. Fabian presumed (in 1970) that it had been lost in the 1917 fire.

The rediscovery of the Catharine Muhlenberg portrait was announced in 2018. It had survived the 1917 fire, and been passed down to George Brooke III's first cousin, Elizabeth Muhlenberg Brooke Blake, of Dallas, Texas. Blake died at age 100 in 2016, and the portrait was subsequently found in the attic of her Newport, Rhode Island house. Blake's sons have placed the pendant portrait on long-term loan to The Speaker's House Museum in Trappe, the family home of Frederick and Catharine Muhlenberg and their seven children at the time the portraits were painted.
