= Hoppner Strait =

Strait in Nunavut, Canada

Coordinates: 66°20′2″N 083°15′54″W

Hoppner Strait is a narrow arm of Foxe Basin east of Lyon Inlet in the Qikiqtaaluk Region of Nunavut, Canada. It is situated between Winter Island and the Melville Peninsula.

The strait is one of several landforms named in honor of Royal Navy officer and Arctic explorer Henry Parkyns Hoppner who surveyed the region during William Edward Parry's First, Second, and Third Arctic Expeditions.
