= Henry Parkyns Hoppner =

Officer of Royal Navy

Captain Henry Parkyns Hoppner
- Born: 1795; London
- Died: 22 December 1833 (aged 37–38); Lisbon
- Relatives: Father, portraitist John Hoppner, Mother, Phoebe Wright, daughter of American sculptor Patience Lovell Wright
- Military career
- Allegiance: United Kingdom
- Branch: Royal Navy
- Rank: Captain
- Commands: HMS Fury
- Conflicts: Napoleonic Wars; War of 1812

Captain Henry Parkyns Hoppner (1795 – 22 December 1833) was an officer of the Royal Navy, Arctic explorer, draughtsman and artist. His career included two ill-fated voyages culminating in the loss of HMS Alceste in 1816 and HMS Fury in 1825.

== Early years ==
Born in London, Hoppner was the fourth child of English portraitist John Hoppner and Phoebe Wright (1761–1827), daughter of American sculptor Patience Lovell Wright. Not much is known of his younger sibling. There were three older brothers whom the father painted in the 1791 oil on canvas, The Hoppner Children, a part of the National Gallery of Art's Widener collection:

- Catherine Hampden Hoppner (1784–1828), Magistrate in the service of the East India Company
- Richard Belgrave Hoppner (1786–1872), British Consul general at Venice,
- Wilson (sometimes known as William) Lascelles Hoppner (1788–?), artist

== Career ==
Hoppner joined the Royal Navy in 1808, and served during the Napoleonic Wars and the War of 1812. His first shipboard experience was on HMS Endymion when she was ordered to Corruna. In 1815, he was commissioned as a junior lieutenant. The following year, he served aboard the ill-fated Alceste under Capt. Murray Maxwell, escorting Lord Amherst to China on a diplomatic mission to the Jiaqing Emperor. With the Alceste shipwrecked, Hoppner switched to the East Indiaman Lion in order to assist his shipwrecked comrades.

In 1818, Lieutenant Hoppner served on the Alexander as second in command under Lieutenant William Edward Parry during Captain John Ross' British Naval Northwest Passage Expedition of 1818, who commanded HMS Isabella. Hoppner participated in three additional Arctic voyages under Parry's command:

- Parry's First Arctic Expedition, 1819–1820, subordinate lieutenant, on board HMS Griper under Lt. Matthew Liddon, while Parry commanded HMS Hecla.
- Parry's Second Arctic Expedition, 1821–1823, lieutenant, on board the Hecla, under Commander George Francis Lyon, while Parry commanded the Fury. Having surveyed an arm of the Foxe Basin's Lyon Inlet on the Melville Peninsula, Hoppner Inlet was named in his honour by Parry.
- Parry's Third Arctic Expedition, 1824-1825: While Parry commanded the Hecla, Hoppner, having attained the rank of Commander, served as second in command of the expedition and commanded the Fury. Hoppner's two lieutenants were Horatio Thomas Austin and James Clark Ross. Suffering from ice damage while overwintering, the ship's stores were unloaded onto the ice, and the Fury was abandoned on 25 August 1825 at Fury Beach on Somerset Island. Upon returning to England, the requisite court martial found Hoppner "no blame whatever", and in December, he was promoted to the rank of Commander. Over the next few decades, the Fury's abandoned provisions came to the rescue of many Arctic explorers, including that of (now Admiral) John Ross.

Hoppner's artistic and creative talents were useful during these voyages. His illustrations were published with the expedition narratives of John Ross and Parry. In addition, Hoppner participated for two seasons in the Royal Arctic Theatre, established by Parry to relieve boredom during the long Arctic winters. Hoppner is also credited with organizing bals masqués, masquerade balls held each month while overwintering in the Arctic. Regarding the masquerades, Parry remarked, "It is impossible that any other idea could have proved more happy, or more exactly suited to our situation."

== Later years ==
Ill-health kept him from accompanying Parry in 1827 during his attempt on the North Pole. Hoppner's request to accompany Admiral Ross in 1829 was rejected.

Hoppner never married. On 22 December 1833, he died in Lisbon during a trip through southern Europe.

== Honours ==
Several Canadian landforms were named in his honour, including:

- Cape Hoppner in the Northwest Territories
- Hoppner Inlet, Hoppner River, Hoppner Strait in Nunavut
- Hoppner Island in Ontario
