= Hoppner Inlet =

Coordinates: 66°48′03″N 083°54′56″W

Hoppner Inlet is an arm of Foxe Basin's Lyon Inlet on southern Melville Peninsula in Qikiqtaaluk Region of Nunavut, Canada.

It was first surveyed by the Royal Navy officer and Arctic explorer Lieutenant Henry Parkyns Hoppner during William Edward Parry's Second Arctic Expedition of 1821–1823, and named by Parry in honor of Hoppner.
