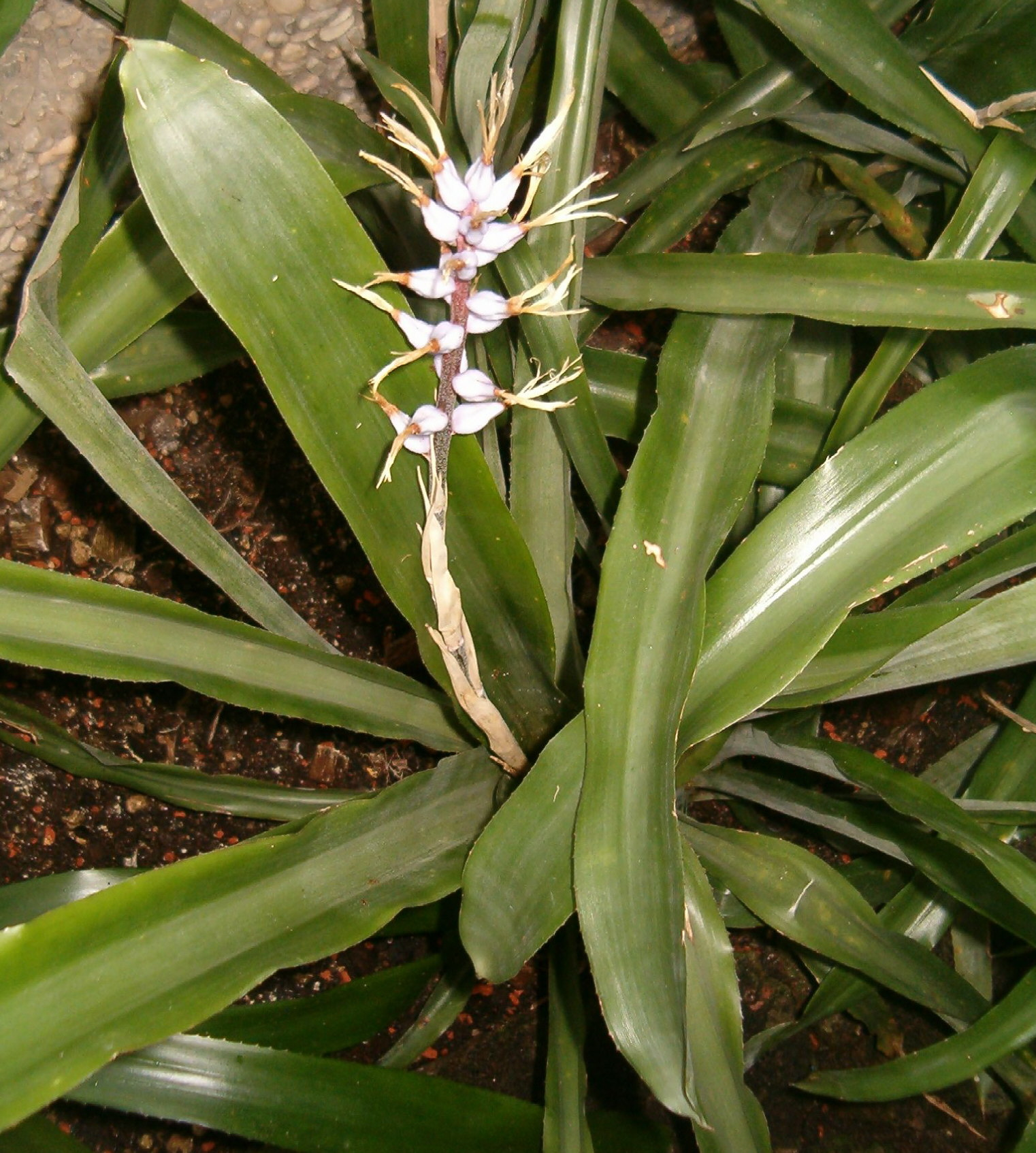

Scientific classification
- Kingdom: Plantae
- Clade: Tracheophytes
- Clade: Angiosperms
- Clade: Monocots
- Clade: Commelinids
- Order: Poales
- Family: Bromeliaceae
- Genus: Aechmea
- Species: A. drakeana

Binomial name
- Aechmea drakeana André

Synonyms
- Pothuava drakeana (André) L.B.Sm. & W.J.Kress

= Aechmea drakeana =

Species of plant

Aechmea drakeana is a plant species in the genus Aechmea. This species is native to Ecuador and Peru.
