= A. mertensii =

A. mertensii may refer to:

- Aechmea mertensii, a plant species
- Agrostis mertensii, the Arctic bent, a grass species in the genus Agrostis
- Amphisbaena mertensii, a worm lizard species found in Brazil
