= A. angustifolia =

A. angustifolia may refer to:

- Aechmea angustifolia, a plant species native to Bolivia and Ecuador
- Allamanda angustifolia, a plant species native from Brazil
- Araucaria angustifolia, another plant species native from Brazil

== See also ==
- Angustifolia
