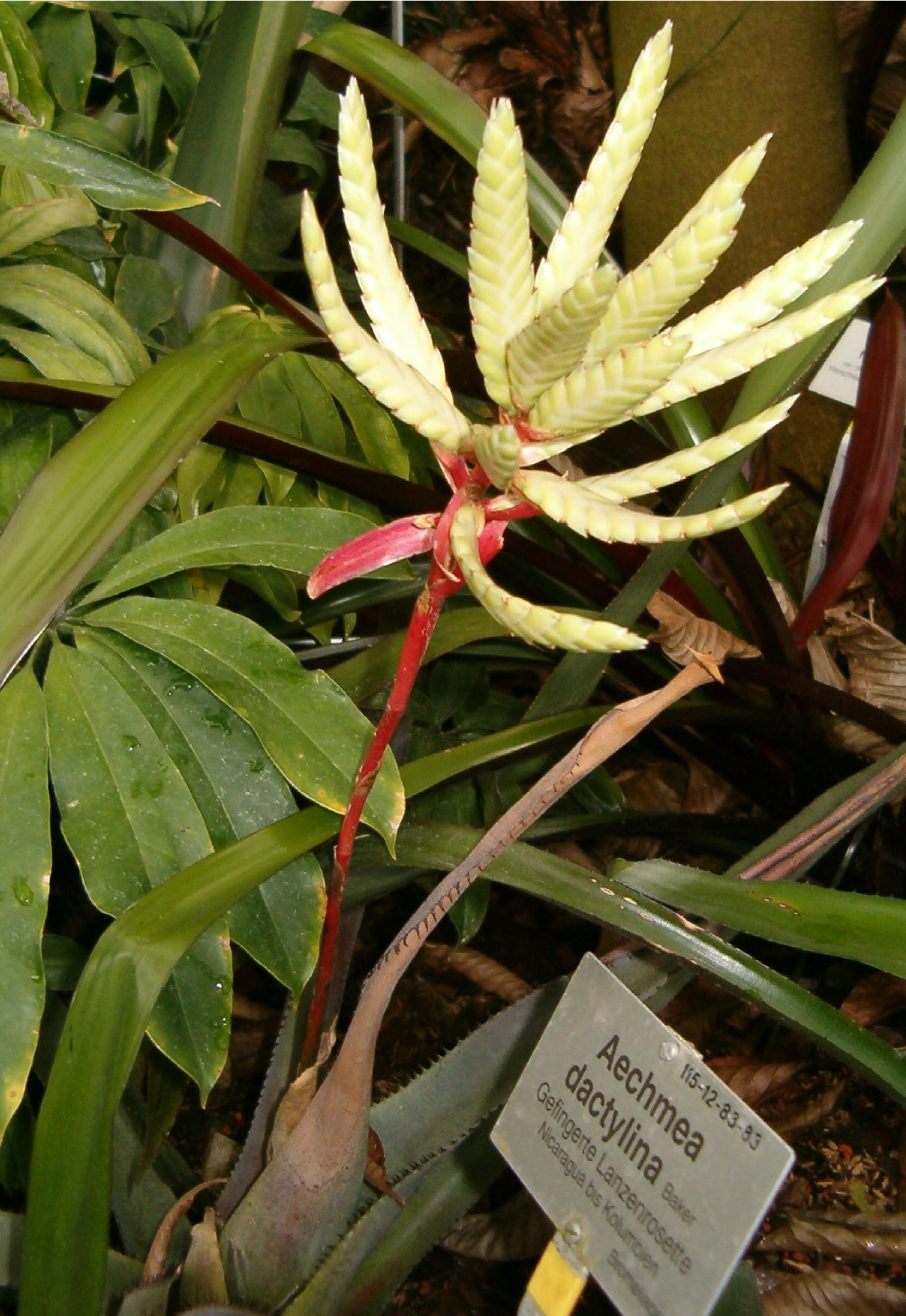

Scientific classification
- Kingdom: Plantae
- Clade: Tracheophytes
- Clade: Angiosperms
- Clade: Monocots
- Clade: Commelinids
- Order: Poales
- Family: Bromeliaceae
- Genus: Aechmea
- Subgenus: Aechmea subg. Aechmea
- Species: A. dactylina

Binomial name
- Aechmea dactylina Baker

= Aechmea dactylina =

Species of flowering plant

Aechmea dactylina is a plant species in the genus Aechmea. This species is native to Costa Rica, Nicaragua, Panama, Colombia and Ecuador.
