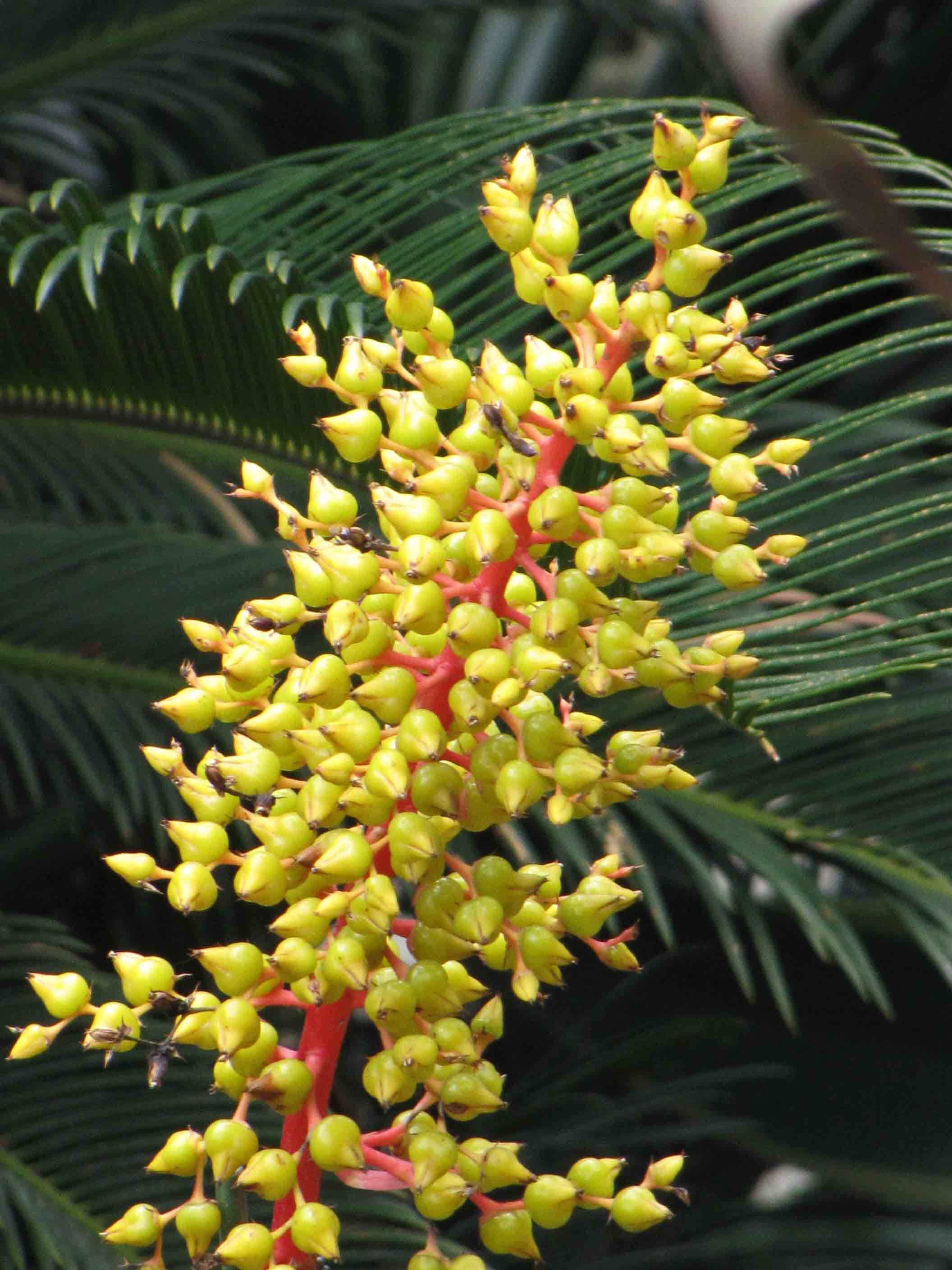
- Aechmea ramosa at the Shanghai Botanical Garden

Scientific classification
- Kingdom: Plantae
- Clade: Tracheophytes
- Clade: Angiosperms
- Clade: Monocots
- Clade: Commelinids
- Order: Poales
- Family: Bromeliaceae
- Genus: Aechmea
- Subgenus: Aechmea subg. Aechmea
- Species: A. ramosa

Binomial name
- Aechmea ramosa Martius ex Schultes f.

Synonyms
- Pironneava ramosa (Mart. ex Schult. & Schult.f.) Wawra; Aechmea reukartiana C.Chev

= Aechmea ramosa =

Species of flowering plant

Aechmea ramosa is a plant species in the genus Aechmea. This species is endemic to eastern Brazil.

Two varieties are recognized:

1. Aechmea ramosa var. festiva L.B.Sm. - Espírito Santo
2. Aechmea ramosa var. ramosa - Bahia

Many cultivars of A. ramosa have been recorded.
