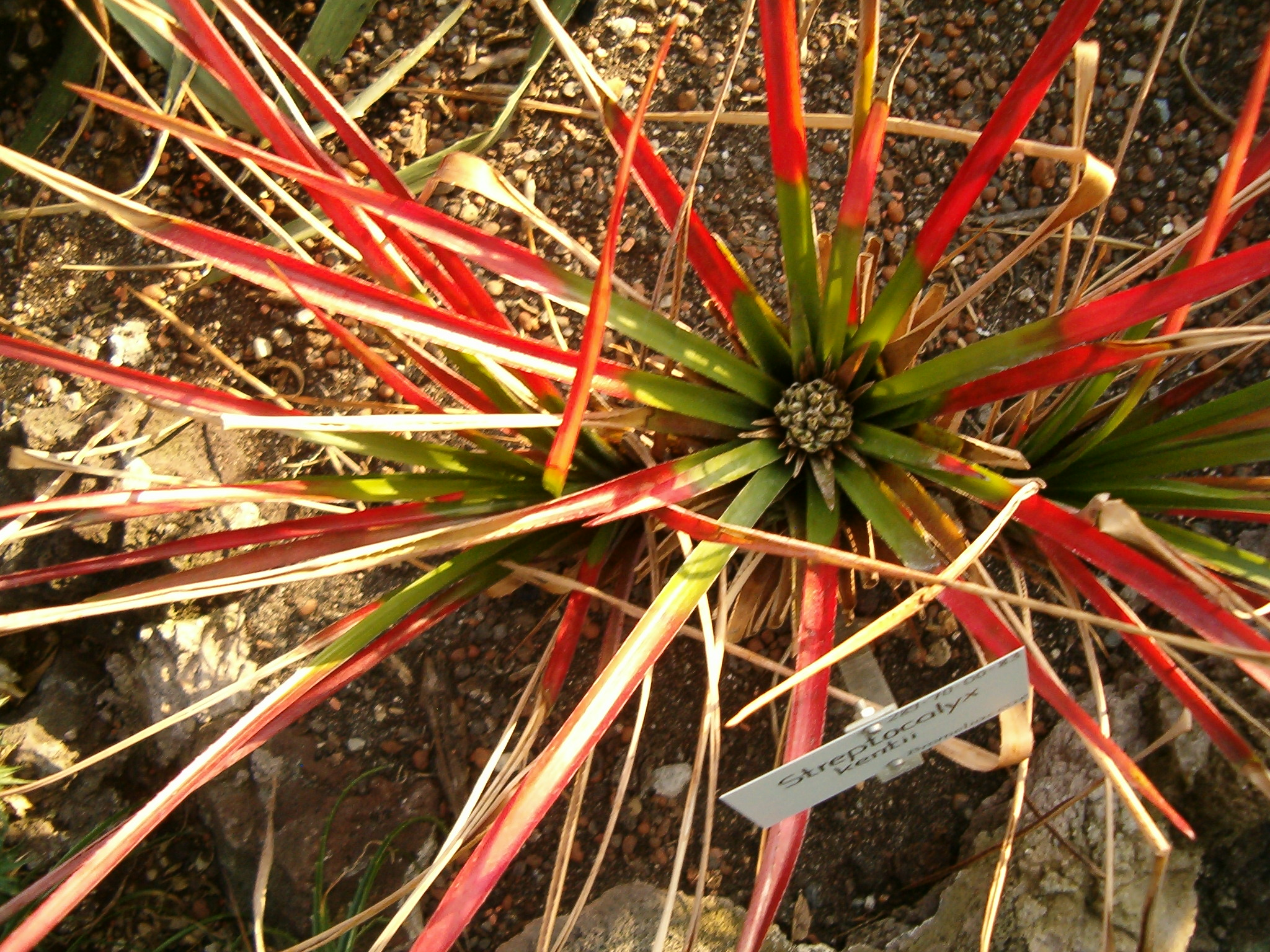

Conservation status
- Endangered (IUCN 3.1)

Scientific classification
- Kingdom: Plantae
- Clade: Tracheophytes
- Clade: Angiosperms
- Clade: Monocots
- Clade: Commelinids
- Order: Poales
- Family: Bromeliaceae
- Genus: Aechmea
- Species: A. kentii

Binomial name
- Aechmea kentii (H.Luther) L.B.Sm. & M.A.Spencer

Synonyms
- Streptocalyx kentii H.E.Luther

= Aechmea kentii =

Species of flowering plant

Aechmea kentii is a species of plant in the family Bromeliaceae. It is endemic to Morona-Santiago Province in Ecuador. Its natural habitats are subtropical or tropical moist lowland forests and subtropical or tropical moist montane forests. It is threatened by habitat loss.
