= Aechmea brachystachys =

Scientific classification
- Kingdom: Plantae
- Clade: Tracheophytes
- Clade: Angiosperms
- Clade: Monocots
- Clade: Commelinids
- Order: Poales
- Family: Bromeliaceae
- Genus: Aechmea
- Species: A. brachystachys

Binomial name
- Aechmea brachystachys (Harms) L.B.Sm. & M.A.Spencer

Synonyms
- Streptocalyx brachystachys Harms

Species of plant

Aechmea brachystachys is a species of flowering plant in the genus Aechmea. It is an epiphyte endemic to northern Peru. It is known only from the type locale near Loreto
