= Aechmea ampla =

Scientific classification
- Kingdom: Plantae
- Clade: Tracheophytes
- Clade: Angiosperms
- Clade: Monocots
- Clade: Commelinids
- Order: Poales
- Family: Bromeliaceae
- Genus: Aechmea
- Subgenus: Aechmea subg. Aechmea
- Species: A. ampla

Binomial name
- Aechmea ampla L.B.Sm.

Species of flowering plant

Aechmea ampla is a plant species in the genus Aechmea. It is endemic to the State of Bahia in Brazil.
