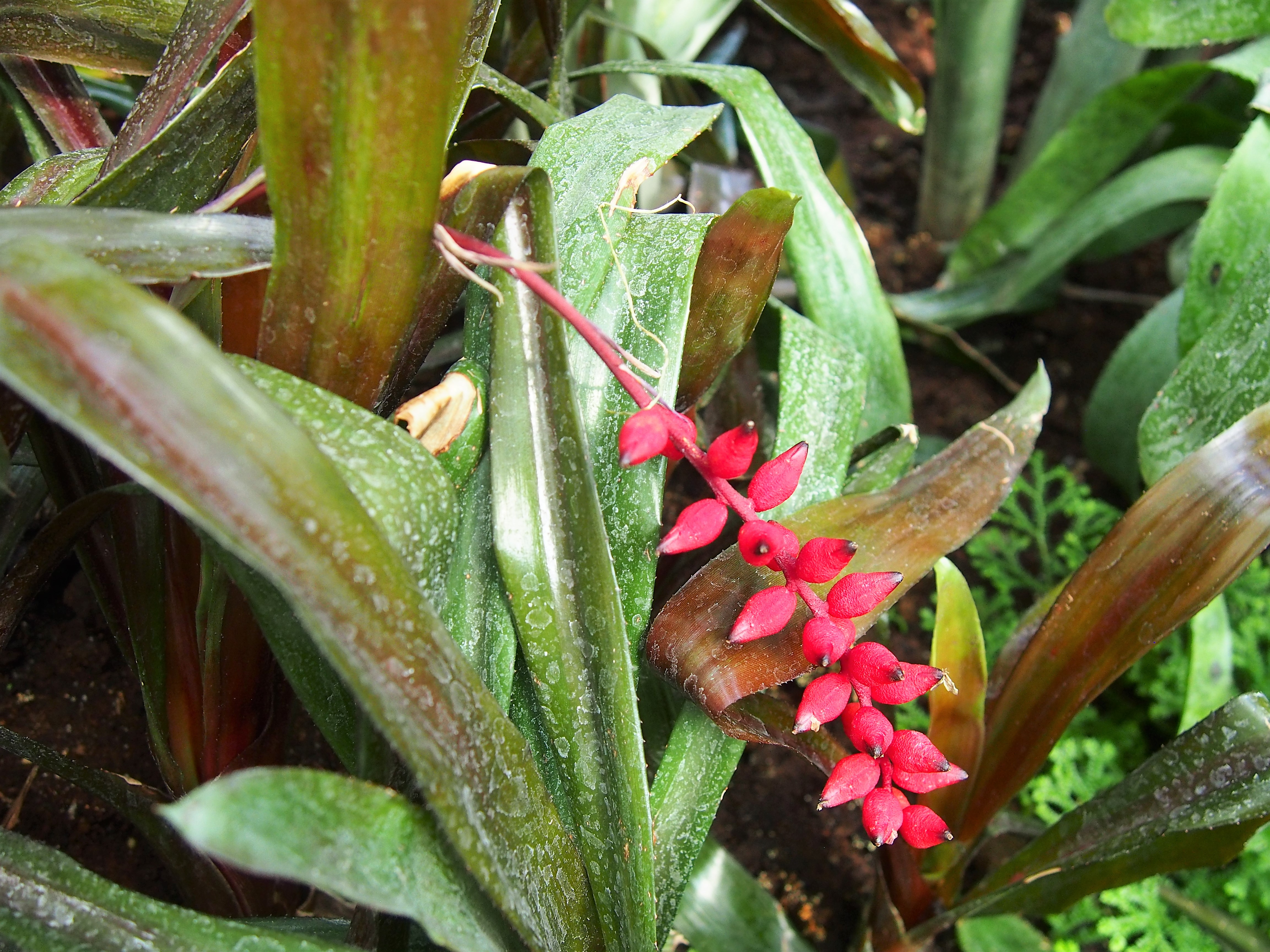

Scientific classification
- Kingdom: Plantae
- Clade: Tracheophytes
- Clade: Angiosperms
- Clade: Monocots
- Clade: Commelinids
- Order: Poales
- Family: Bromeliaceae
- Genus: Aechmea
- Species: A. polyantha

Binomial name
- Aechmea polyantha E.Pereira & Reitz

= Aechmea polyantha =

Species of bromeliad

Aechmea polyantha is a species of epiphytic and lithophytic South American bromeliad. They grow in the upper canopy of forests in the Brazilian Amazon and in French Guiana. They have been recorded growing on bare granite, where they form mats of roots and microorganisms such as algae, although they remain small there; larger ones stay around clumps of trees.
