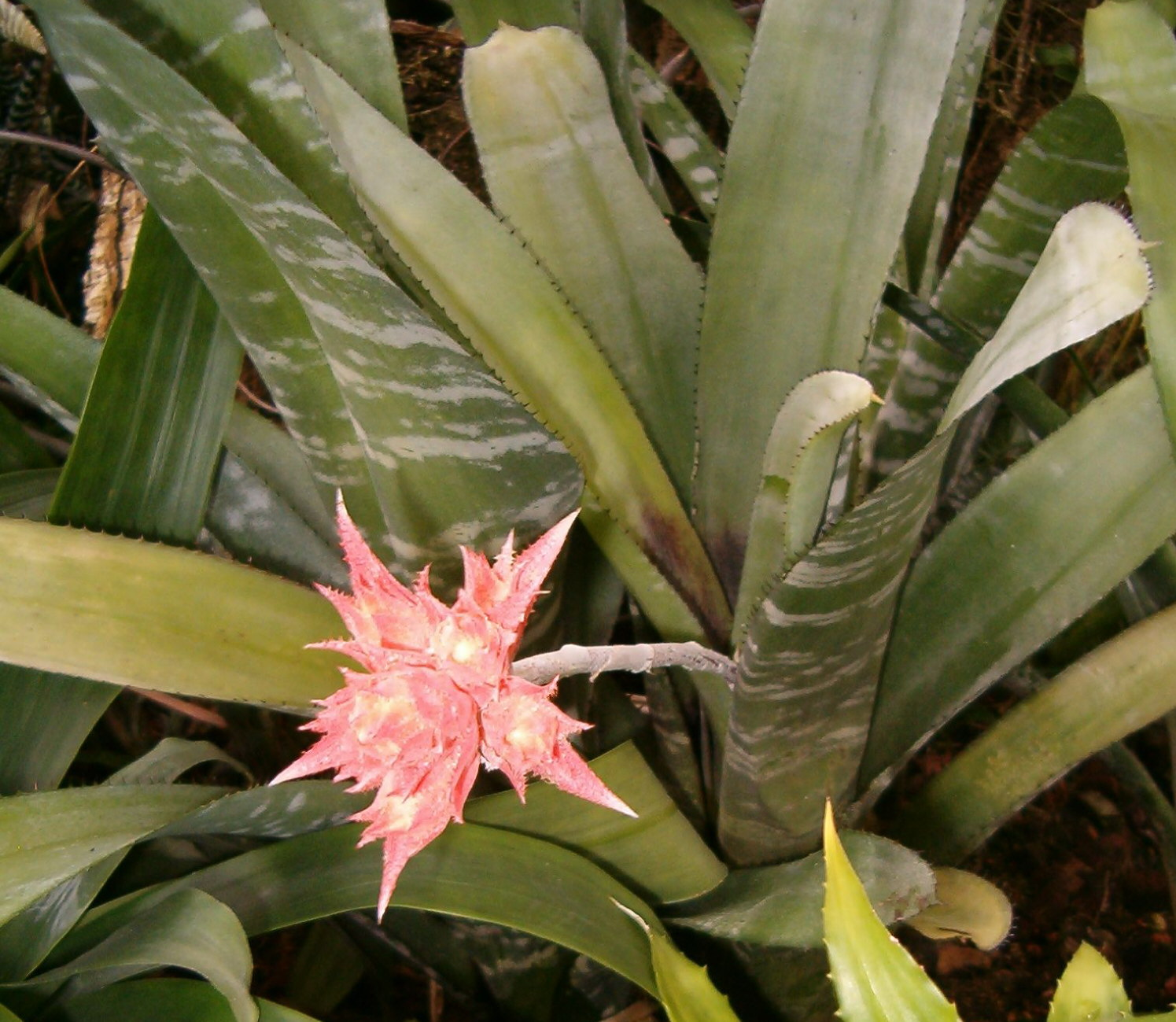

Scientific classification
- Kingdom: Plantae
- Clade: Tracheophytes
- Clade: Angiosperms
- Clade: Monocots
- Clade: Commelinids
- Order: Poales
- Family: Bromeliaceae
- Genus: Aechmea
- Subgenus: Aechmea subg. Aechmea
- Species: A. flavorosea

Binomial name
- Aechmea flavorosea E.Pereira

Synonyms
- Platyaechmea flavorosea (E.Pereira) L.B.Sm. & W.J.Kress

= Aechmea flavorosea =

Species of flowering plant

Aechmea flavorosea is a species of flowering plant in the genus Aechmea. This species is endemic to the State of Rio de Janeiro in Brazil.

== Cultivars ==
- Aechmea 'Fireflies'
- Aechmea 'Gold Sister'
- Aechmea 'Silver Sister'
- Aechmea 'Sister Smoothie O'
- Aechmea 'Sister Smoothie P'
