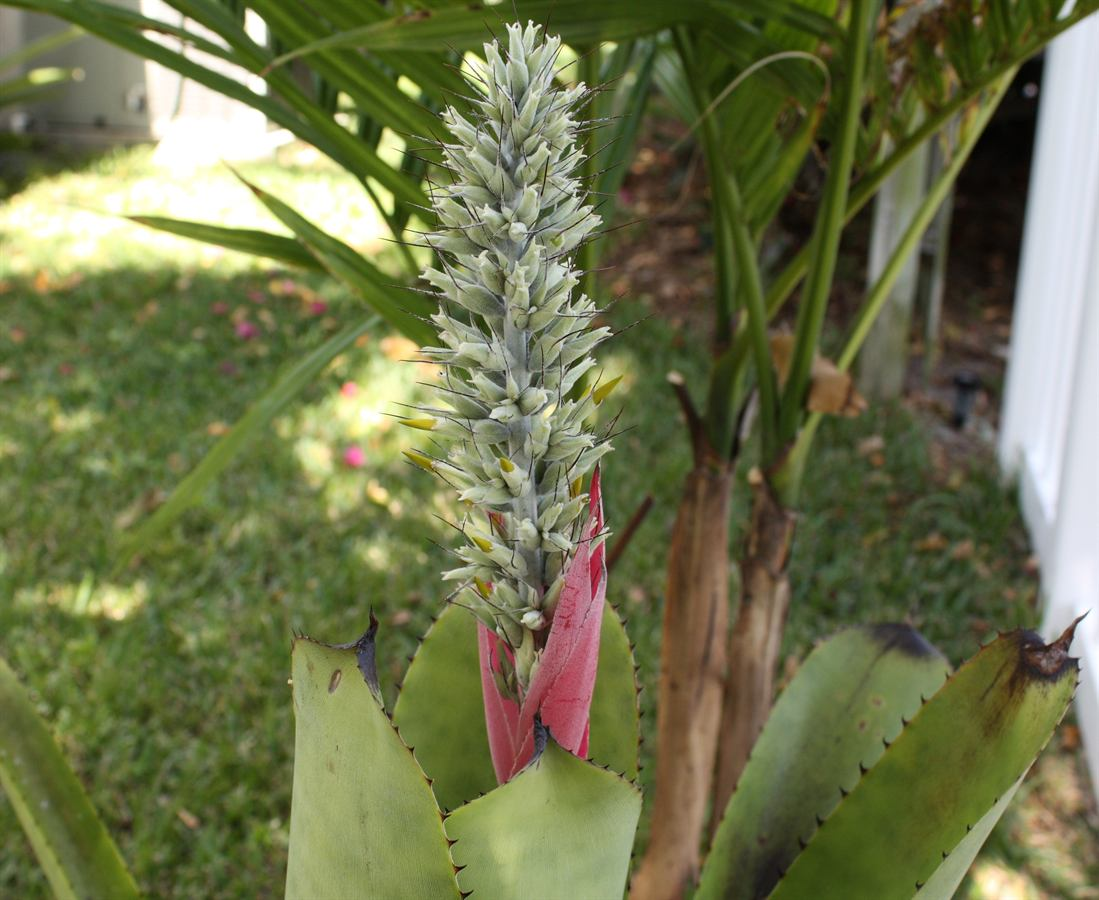

Scientific classification
- Kingdom: Plantae
- Clade: Tracheophytes
- Clade: Angiosperms
- Clade: Monocots
- Clade: Commelinids
- Order: Poales
- Family: Bromeliaceae
- Genus: Aechmea
- Subgenus: Aechmea subg. Aechmea
- Species: A. kuntzeana

Binomial name
- Aechmea kuntzeana Mez

Synonyms
- Hoiriri kuntzeana (Mez) Kuntze

= Aechmea kuntzeana =

Species of flowering plant

Aechmea kuntzeana is a plant species in the genus Aechmea. This species is endemic to eastern Bolivia. This plant was classified by Carl Christian Mez in 1896, he also validly published the name Aechmea kuntzeana.

== Characteristics ==
- Growth: Aechmea kuntzeana is a perennial plant, in fact it can reach a height of 1 to 1,5 metres.
- Leaves: Its simple leaves are basal. They are spatulate and sessile, with serrate margins and parallel venation.
- Flowers and Fruits: Produces spikes of green tubular flowers. And it produces berries, as Aechmea kuntzeana is a perennial plant

== Cultivation ==
Aechmea kuntzeana plants prefer sun to part shade, and the soil of the container where it is moist. With regard to the surface, it should be sandy, sandy-sandy, loamy, silty, loamy or clayey. It should also be noted that this plant can only tolerate temperatures above 1°C as a minimum, otherwise the life of the plant and its inability to grow would be put at risk.
