= Aechmea fraudulosa =

Scientific classification
- Kingdom: Plantae
- Clade: Embryophytes
- Clade: Tracheophytes
- Clade: Spermatophytes
- Clade: Angiosperms
- Clade: Monocots
- Clade: Commelinids
- Order: Poales
- Family: Bromeliaceae
- Genus: Aechmea
- Subgenus: Aechmea subg. Aechmea
- Species: A. fraudulosa

Binomial name
- Aechmea fraudulosa Mez

Synonyms
- Homotypic Synonyms: Aechmea blanchetii (Baker) Mez; Streptocalyx blanchetii Baker

Species of flowering plant

Aechmea fraudulosa is a species of flowering plant in the family Bromeliaceae. This species is endemic to the State of Bahia in eastern Brazil.
