= Aechmea poitaei =

Scientific classification
- Kingdom: Plantae
- Clade: Tracheophytes
- Clade: Angiosperms
- Clade: Monocots
- Clade: Commelinids
- Order: Poales
- Family: Bromeliaceae
- Genus: Aechmea
- Species: A. poitaei

Binomial name
- Aechmea poitaei (Baker) L.B.Sm. & M.A.Spencer

Synonyms
- Streptocalyx poitaei Baker; Streptocalyx tessmannii Harms

Species of flowering plant

Aechmea poitaei is a species of flowering plant in the genus Aechmea. This species is native to Ecuador, Colombia, Peru and French Guiana.
