= Aechmea lugoi =

Conservation status
- Vulnerable (IUCN 3.1)

Scientific classification
- Kingdom: Plantae
- Clade: Tracheophytes
- Clade: Angiosperms
- Clade: Monocots
- Clade: Commelinids
- Order: Poales
- Family: Bromeliaceae
- Genus: Aechmea
- Species: A. lugoi

Binomial name
- Aechmea lugoi (Gilmartin & H.Luther) L.B.Sm. & M.A.Spencer

Synonyms
- Streptocalyx lugoi Gilmartin & H.E.Luther

Species of flowering plant

Aechmea lugoi is a species of flowering plant in the family Bromeliaceae. It is an epiphyte endemic to the Pastaza region of Ecuador. Its natural habitat is tropical lowland and submontane Amazon rainforest from 500 to 1,000 metres elevation. It is threatened by habitat loss.
