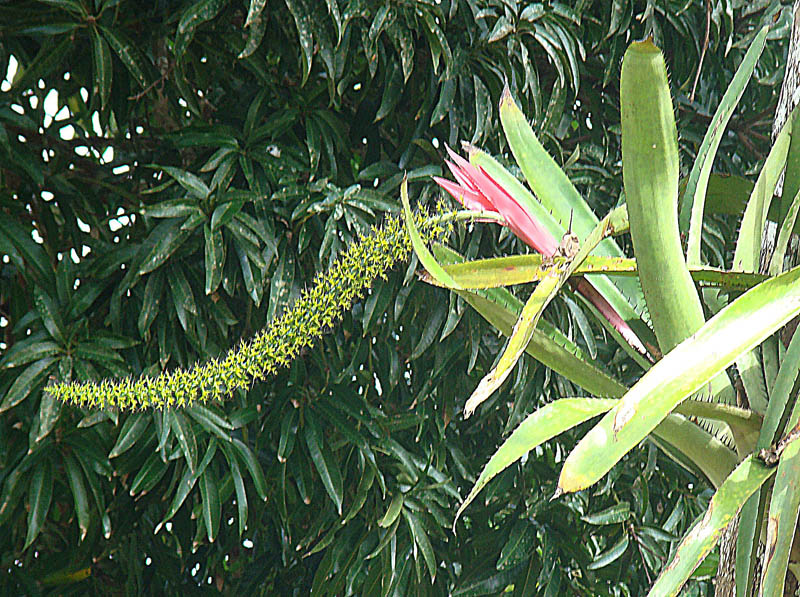

Scientific classification
- Kingdom: Plantae
- Clade: Tracheophytes
- Clade: Angiosperms
- Clade: Monocots
- Clade: Commelinids
- Order: Poales
- Family: Bromeliaceae
- Genus: Aechmea
- Subgenus: Aechmea subg. Aechmea
- Species: A. setigera

Binomial name
- Aechmea setigera Martius ex Schultes f.

Synonyms
- Aechmea prieuriana Baker; Echinostachys prieuriana Brongn. ex Baker

= Aechmea setigera =

Species of flowering plant

Aechmea setigera is a plant species in the genus Aechmea. This species is native to Bolivia, Venezuela, Colombia, Panama, Suriname, French Guiana, Ecuador, and northern Brazil.
