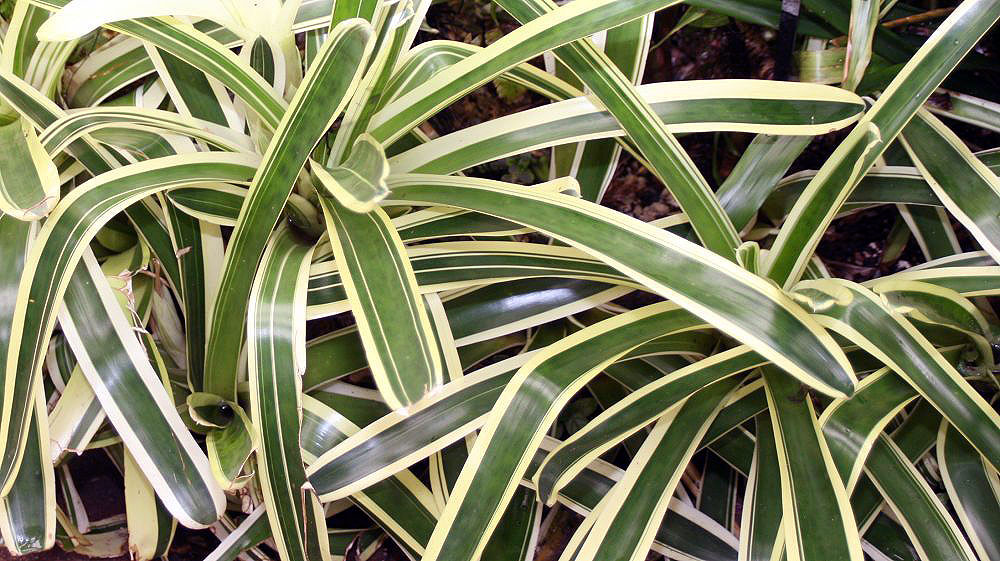
- Aechmea mollis at the Fairchild Tropical Botanic Garden, Miami

Scientific classification
- Kingdom: Plantae
- Clade: Tracheophytes
- Clade: Angiosperms
- Clade: Monocots
- Clade: Commelinids
- Order: Poales
- Family: Bromeliaceae
- Genus: Aechmea
- Subgenus: Aechmea subg. Aechmea
- Species: A. mollis

Binomial name
- Aechmea mollis L.B.Sm.

= Aechmea mollis =

Species of flowering plant

Aechmea mollis is a plant species in the genus Aechmea. This species is endemic to the State of Bahia in eastern Brazil.
