= Aechmea pyramidalis =

Scientific classification
- Kingdom: Plantae
- Clade: Tracheophytes
- Clade: Angiosperms
- Clade: Monocots
- Clade: Commelinids
- Order: Poales
- Family: Bromeliaceae
- Genus: Aechmea
- Subgenus: Aechmea subg. Aechmea
- Species: A. pyramidalis

Binomial name
- Aechmea pyramidalis Bentham

Synonyms
- Hohenbergia pyramidalis (Benth.) Baker; Aechmea edmondstonei Baker

Species of flowering plant

Aechmea pyramidalis is a plant species in the genus Aechmea. This species is native to Ecuador, Colombia and Peru.
