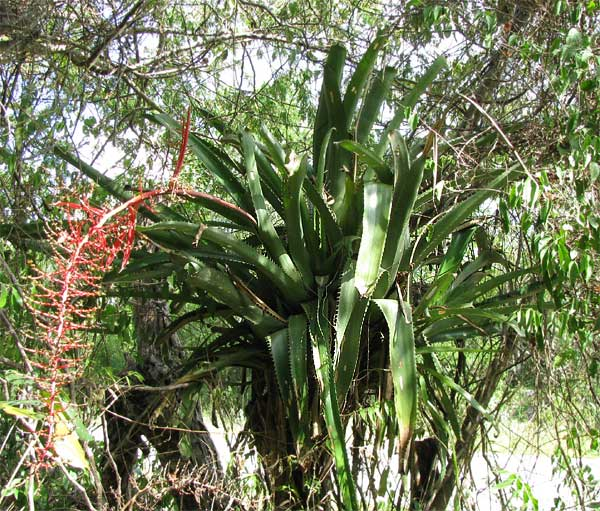

Scientific classification
- Kingdom: Plantae
- Clade: Tracheophytes
- Clade: Angiosperms
- Clade: Monocots
- Clade: Commelinids
- Order: Poales
- Family: Bromeliaceae
- Genus: Aechmea
- Subgenus: Aechmea subg. Aechmea
- Species: A. bracteata

Binomial name
- Aechmea bracteata (Swartz) Grisebach

Synonyms
- Bromelia bracteata Sw.; Hoplophytum bracteatum (Sw.) K.Koch; Hohenbergia bracteata (Sw.) Baker; Aechmea schiedeana Schltdl.; Aechmea laxiflora Benth.; Hohenbergia bracteata Beer; Hohenbergia laxiflora (Benth.) Baker; Aechmea regularis Baker; Aechmea macracantha Brongn. ex André; Aechmea barleei Baker; Aechmea isabellina Baker; Tillandsia spinosa Sessé & Moc.; Aechmea bracteata var. pacifica Beutelsp.

= Aechmea bracteata =

Species of flowering plant

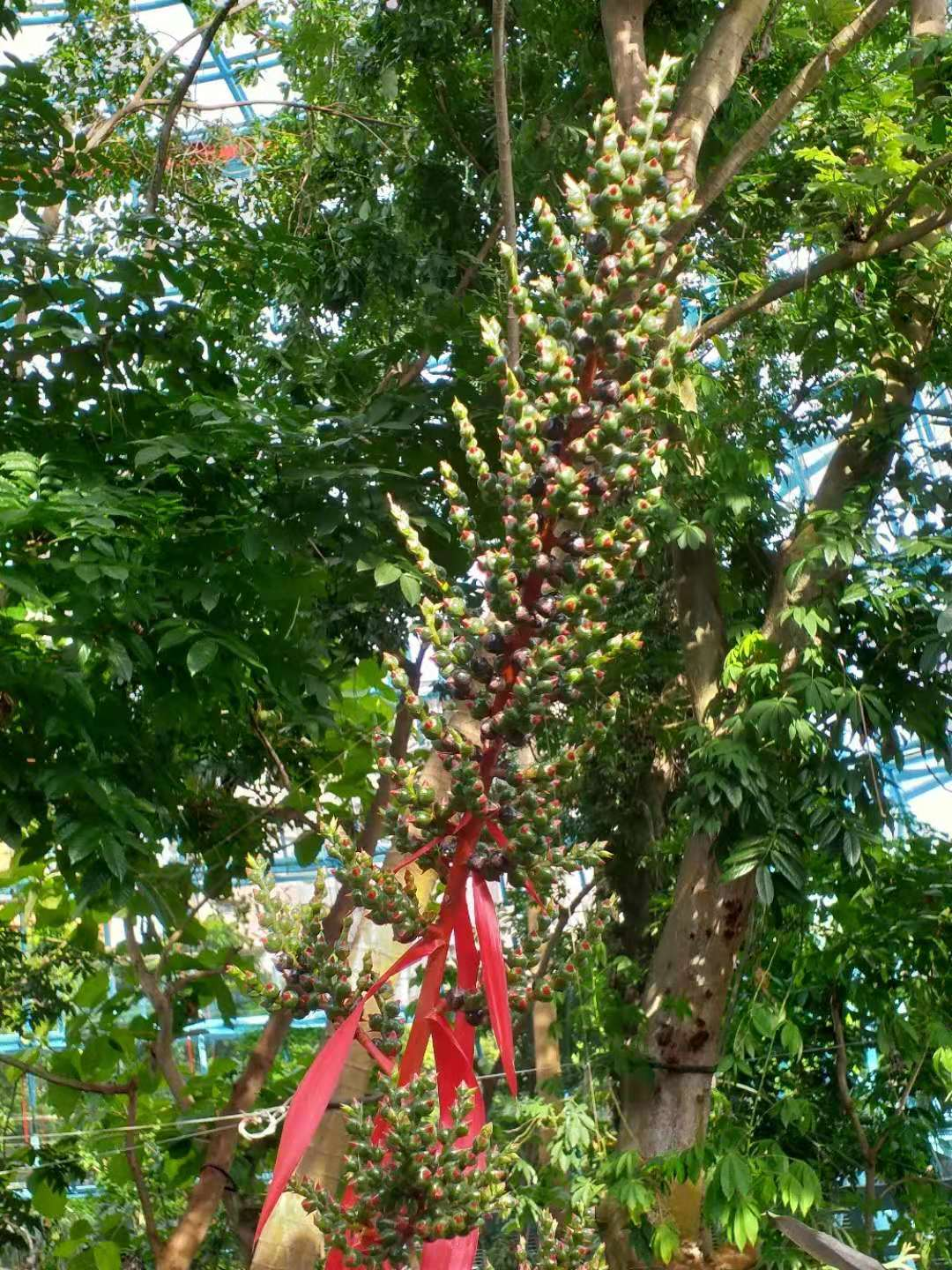
Red bract and inflorescence

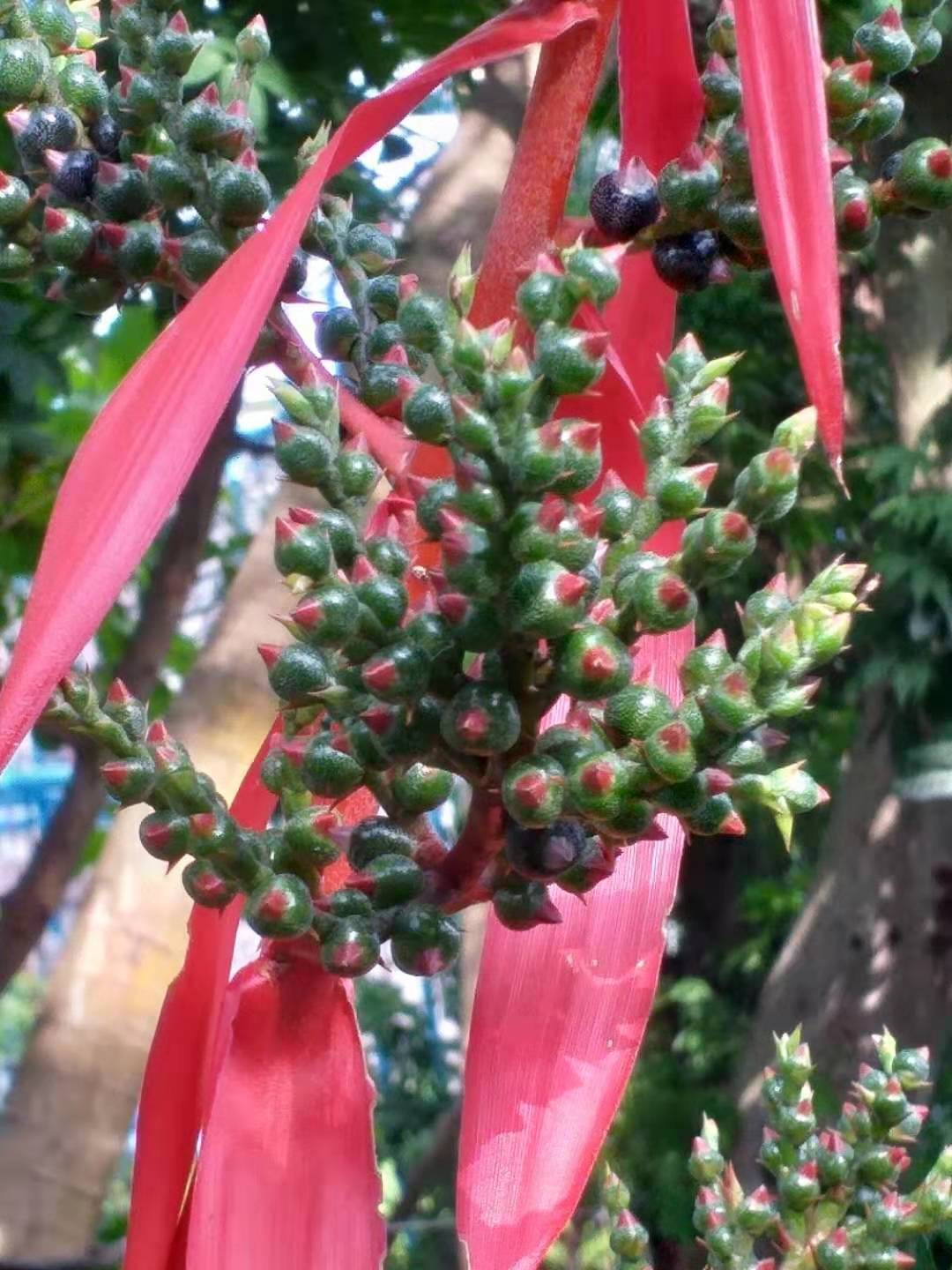
Aechmea bracteata

Aechmea bracteata is a plant species in the genus Aechmea. This species is native to Central America, Mexico, Colombia, and Venezuela; it is also reportedly naturalized in the Bahamas.

== Cultivars ==
- Aechmea 'Tritone'
