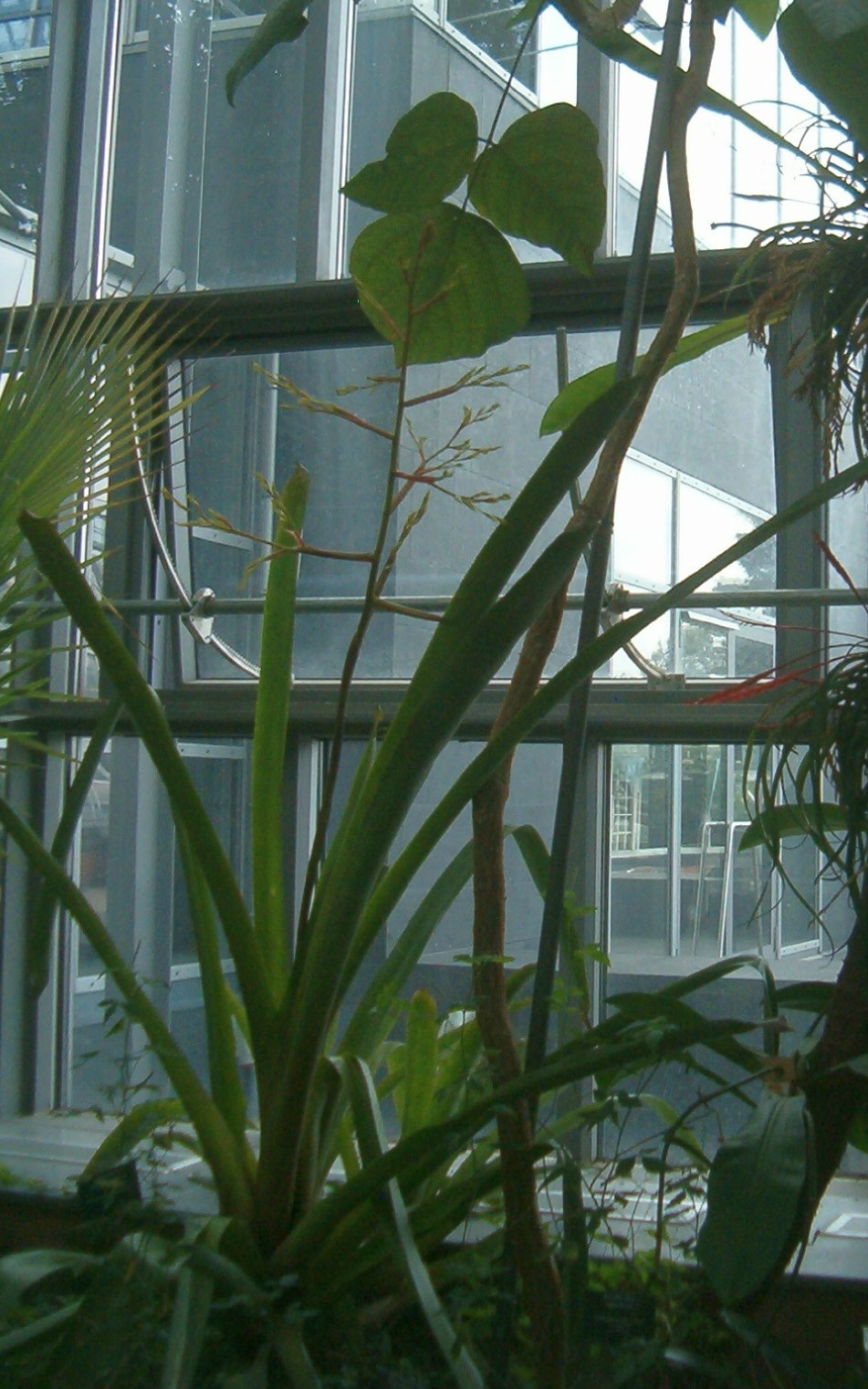

Scientific classification
- Kingdom: Plantae
- Clade: Tracheophytes
- Clade: Angiosperms
- Clade: Monocots
- Clade: Commelinids
- Order: Poales
- Family: Bromeliaceae
- Genus: Aechmea
- Subgenus: Aechmea subg. Aechmea
- Species: A. eurycorymbus

Binomial name
- Aechmea eurycorymbus Harms

= Aechmea eurycorymbus =

Species of flowering plant

Aechmea eurycorymbus is a plant species in the genus Aechmea. This species is endemic to eastern Brazil.

== Cultivars ==
The species is widely cultivated as an ornamental. Cultivars include:

- Aechmea 'Big Harv'
- Aechmea 'Carioca'
- Aechmea 'Forest Fire'
- × Portemea 'Hilda Ariza'
