= Aechmea mutica =

Scientific classification
- Kingdom: Plantae
- Clade: Tracheophytes
- Clade: Angiosperms
- Clade: Monocots
- Clade: Commelinids
- Order: Poales
- Family: Bromeliaceae
- Genus: Aechmea
- Subgenus: Aechmea subg. Aechmea
- Species: A. mutica

Binomial name
- Aechmea mutica L.B.Sm.

Species of flowering plant

Aechmea mutica is a plant species in the genus Aechmea. This species is endemic to the State of Espírito Santo in eastern Brazil.
