= Aechmea hoppii =

Scientific classification
- Kingdom: Plantae
- Clade: Tracheophytes
- Clade: Angiosperms
- Clade: Monocots
- Clade: Commelinids
- Order: Poales
- Family: Bromeliaceae
- Genus: Aechmea
- Subgenus: Aechmea subg. Aechmea
- Species: A. hoppii

Binomial name
- Aechmea hoppii (Harms) L.B.Sm.

Synonyms
- Streptocalyx hoppii Harms; Streptocalyx colombianus var. laxus E.Gross; Aechmea colombiana var. laxa (E.Gross) L.B.Sm. & M.A.Spencer

Species of flowering plant

Aechmea hoppii is a plant species in the genus Aechmea. This species is native to Colombia, Ecuador and Peru.

== Cultivars ==
- Aechmea 'Caprice'
