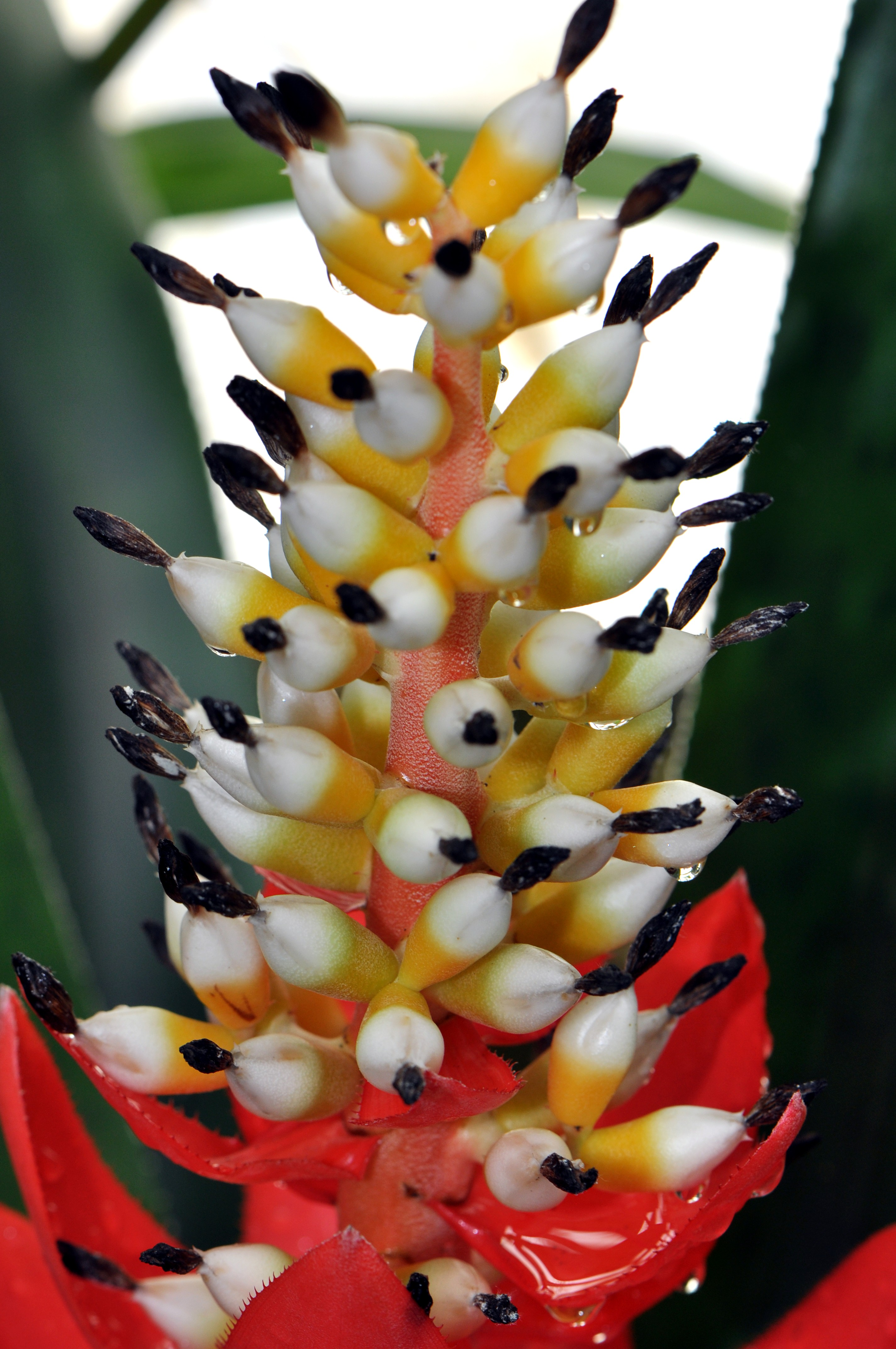

Scientific classification
- Kingdom: Plantae
- Clade: Tracheophytes
- Clade: Angiosperms
- Clade: Monocots
- Clade: Commelinids
- Order: Poales
- Family: Bromeliaceae
- Genus: Aechmea
- Subgenus: Aechmea subg. Aechmea
- Species: A. woronowii

Binomial name
- Aechmea woronowii Harms

Synonyms
- Streptocalyx subnuda L.B.Sm.; Streptocalyx holmesii Slingerland

= Aechmea woronowii =

Species of flowering plant

Aechmea woronowii is a plant species in the genus Aechmea. This species is native to Ecuador, Peru and Colombia.
