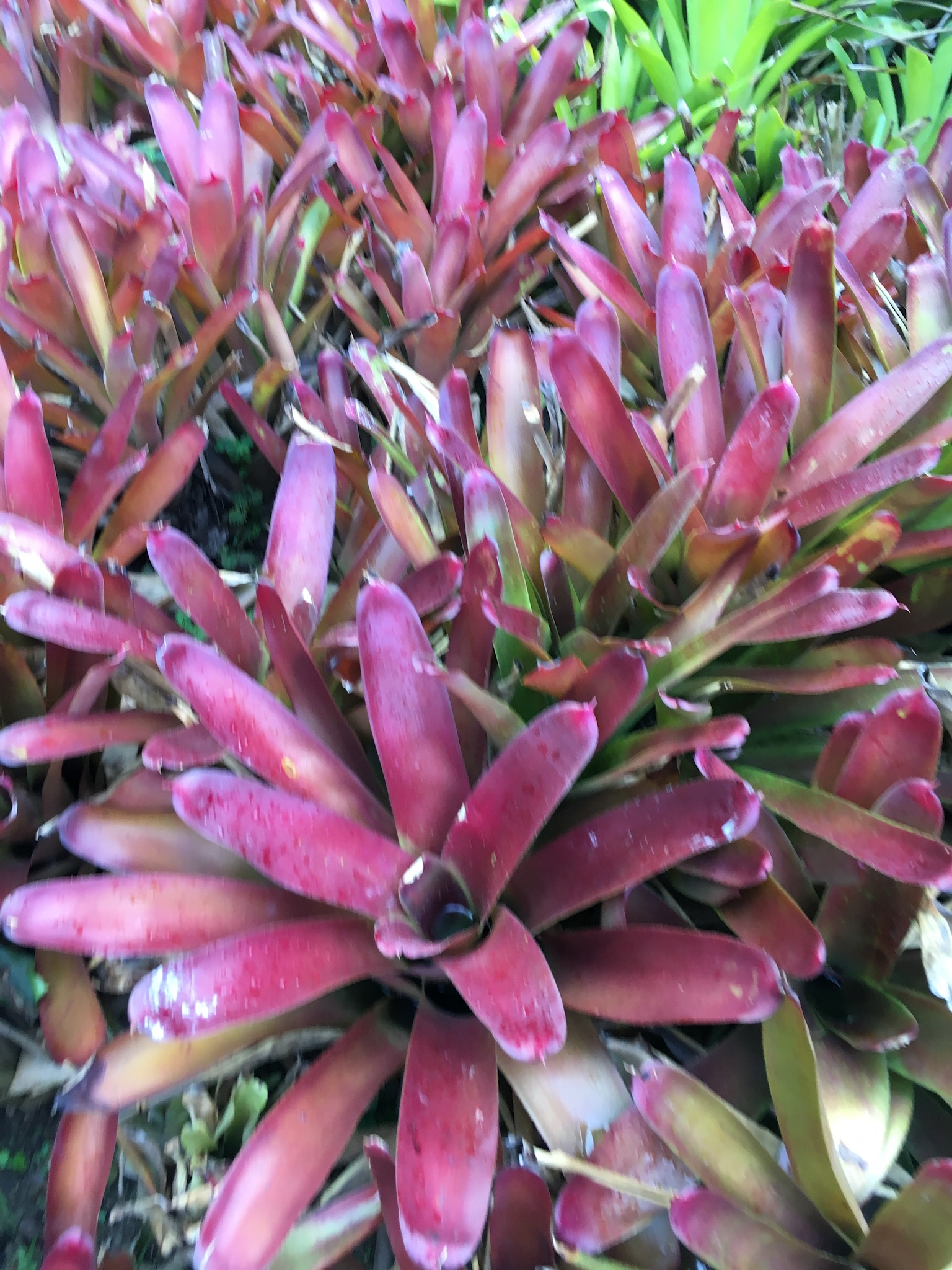
- At Singapore Marina South, 2019

Scientific classification
- Kingdom: Plantae
- Clade: Tracheophytes
- Clade: Angiosperms
- Clade: Monocots
- Clade: Commelinids
- Order: Poales
- Family: Bromeliaceae
- Subfamily: Bromelioideae
- Genus: Aechmea
- Species: A. pseudonudicaulis

Binomial name
- Aechmea pseudonudicaulis Leme

= Aechmea pseudonudicaulis =

Species of flowering plant

Aechmea pseudonudicaulis is a plant species in the genus Aechmea. This species is endemic to the State of Espírito Santo in eastern Brazil.
