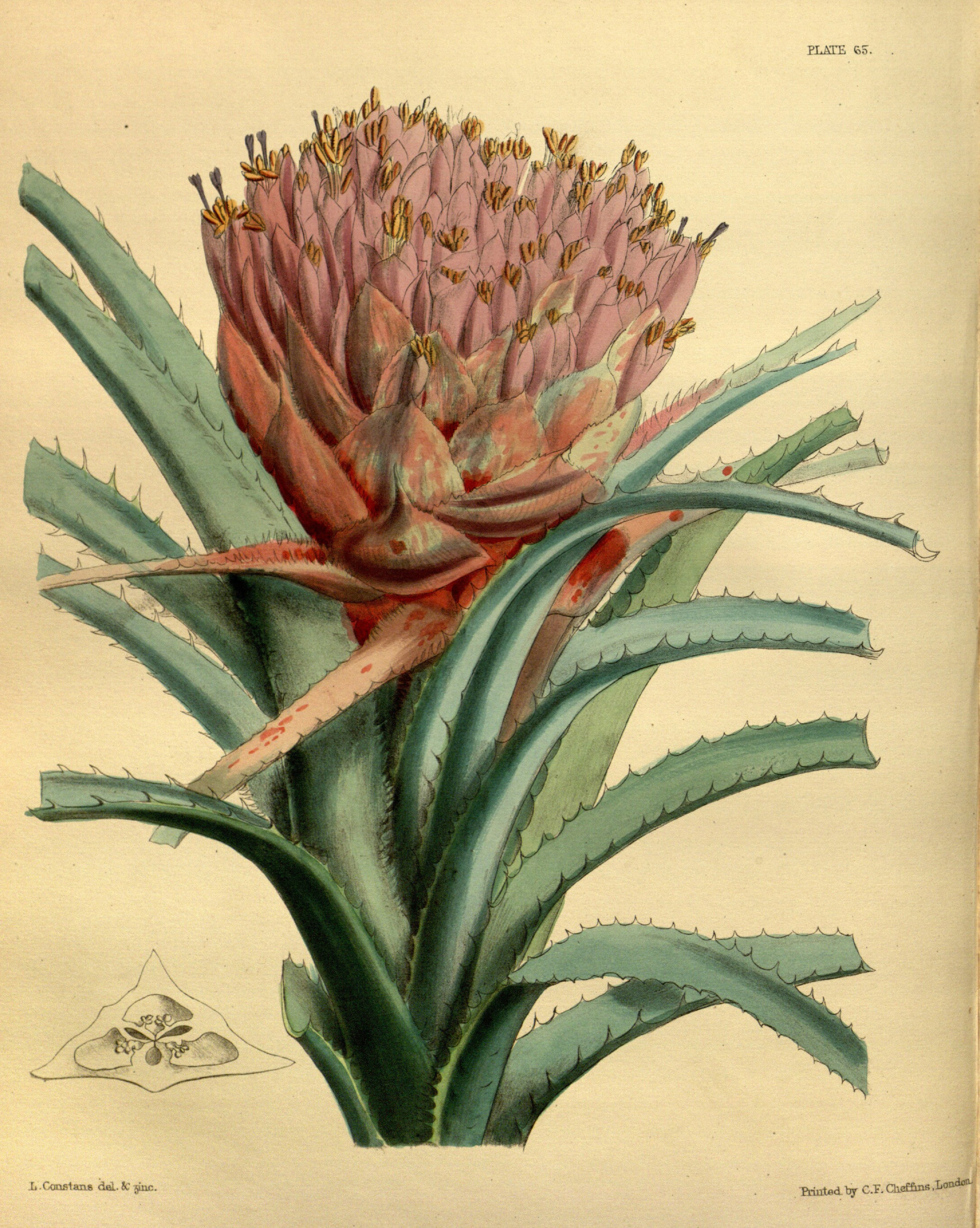

Scientific classification
- Kingdom: Plantae
- Clade: Tracheophytes
- Clade: Angiosperms
- Clade: Monocots
- Clade: Commelinids
- Order: Poales
- Family: Bromeliaceae
- Genus: Aechmea
- Species: A. longifolia

Binomial name
- Aechmea longifolia (Rudge) L.B.Sm. & M.A.Spencer

Synonyms
- Bromelia longifolia Rudge; Streptocalyx longifolius (Rudge) Baker; Streptocalyx angustifolius Mez

= Aechmea longifolia =

Species of flowering plant

Aechmea longifolia is a species of flowering plant in the genus Aechmea. This species is native to Bolivia, Venezuela, Colombia, the Guianas, northern Brazil, Peru and Ecuador.
