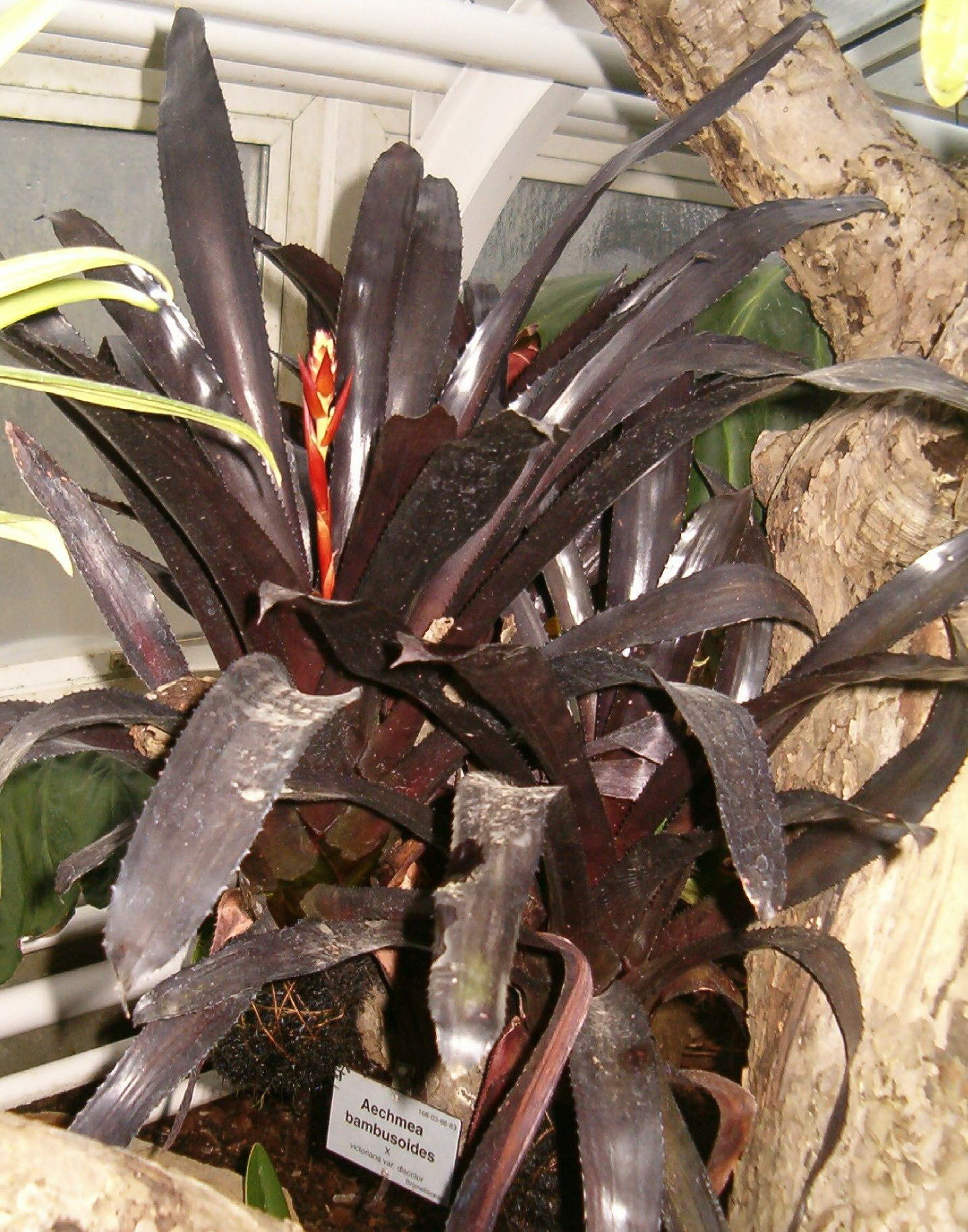
- Aechmea bambusoides × Aechmea victoriana discolor

Scientific classification
- Kingdom: Plantae
- Clade: Tracheophytes
- Clade: Angiosperms
- Clade: Monocots
- Clade: Commelinids
- Order: Poales
- Family: Bromeliaceae
- Genus: Aechmea
- Subgenus: Aechmea subg. Aechmea
- Species: A. bambusoides

Binomial name
- Aechmea bambusoides L.B.Sm. & Reitz

= Aechmea bambusoides =

Species of flowering plant

Aechmea bambusoides is a plant species in the genus Aechmea. This species is endemic to Brazil. It is native to the States of Minas Gerais and Rio de Janeiro. Mature fruits (berries) are pyriform, white and contain seeds spread in a fleshy transparent mucilage. Seeds are falcate-shaped, with a narrow micropylar portion, rough texture, brown-red colour and no appendages.
