= Aechmea vallerandii =

Scientific classification
- Kingdom: Plantae
- Clade: Tracheophytes
- Clade: Angiosperms
- Clade: Monocots
- Clade: Commelinids
- Order: Poales
- Family: Bromeliaceae
- Genus: Aechmea
- Species: A. vallerandii

Binomial name
- Aechmea vallerandii (Carrière) Erhardt, Götz & Seybold

Synonyms
- Lamprococcus vallerandii Carrière; Streptocalyx vallerandii (Carrière) E.Morren; Streptocalyx poeppigii Beer; Streptocalyx juruanus Ule; Aechmea beeriana L.B.Sm. & M.A.Spencer

Species of flowering plant

Aechmea vallerandii is a species of flowering plant in the genus Aechmea. This was for a time called A. beeriana but was reclassified in 2008. It is native to Panama and to northern South America (Colombia, Venezuela, Suriname, French Guiana, Colombia, Peru, northern Brazil).

== Cultivars ==
- Aechmea 'Salvador'
- Aechmea 'Tropic Torch'
