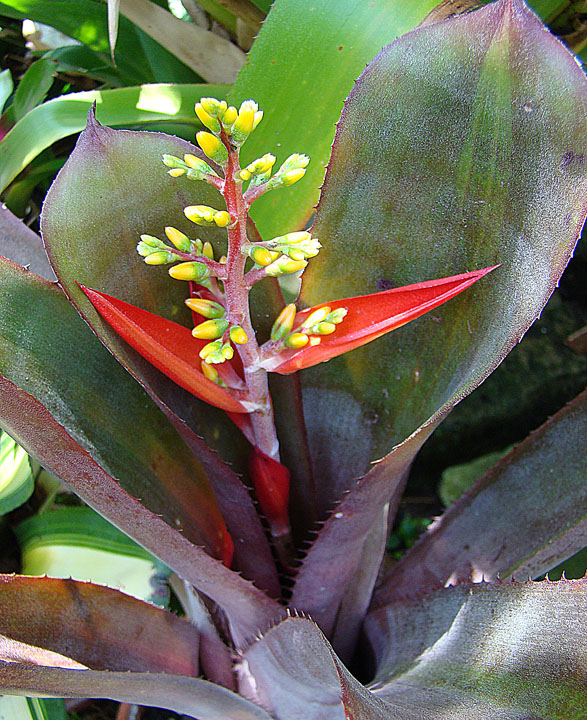

Scientific classification
- Kingdom: Plantae
- Clade: Tracheophytes
- Clade: Angiosperms
- Clade: Monocots
- Clade: Commelinids
- Order: Poales
- Family: Bromeliaceae
- Genus: Aechmea
- Subgenus: Aechmea subg. Aechmea
- Species: A. politii

Binomial name
- Aechmea politii L.B.Sm.

= Aechmea politii =

Species of flowering plant

Aechmea politii is a plant species in the genus Aechmea. This species is native to Venezuela, Colombia, Guyana and French Guiana.
