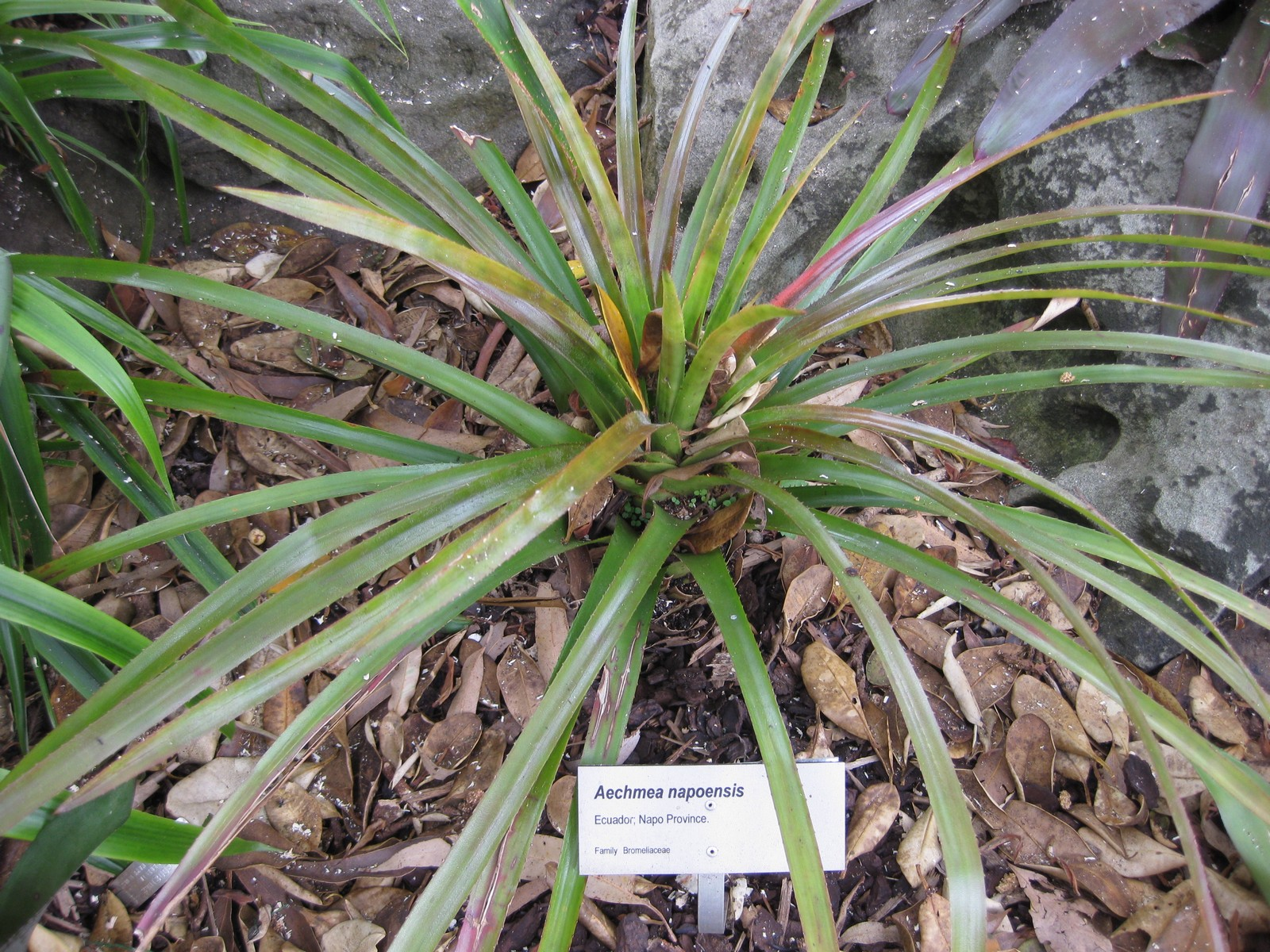

Conservation status
- Near Threatened (IUCN 3.1)

Scientific classification
- Kingdom: Plantae
- Clade: Tracheophytes
- Clade: Angiosperms
- Clade: Monocots
- Clade: Commelinids
- Order: Poales
- Family: Bromeliaceae
- Genus: Aechmea
- Species: A. napoensis

Binomial name
- Aechmea napoensis L.B.Sm. & M.A.Spencer

Synonyms
- Streptocalyx pallidus H.E.Luther; Streptocalyx geminiflorus Philcox 1992 not Harms 1935; Streptocalyx squamiferus Philcox

= Aechmea napoensis =

Species of flowering plant

Aechmea napoensis is a species of plant in the family Bromeliaceae. It is endemic to Ecuador. Its natural habitats are subtropical or tropical moist lowland forests and subtropical or tropical moist montane forests. It is threatened by habitat loss.
