= Aechmea geminiflora =

Conservation status
- Data Deficient (IUCN 3.1)

Scientific classification
- Kingdom: Plantae
- Clade: Tracheophytes
- Clade: Angiosperms
- Clade: Monocots
- Clade: Commelinids
- Order: Poales
- Family: Bromeliaceae
- Genus: Aechmea
- Species: A. geminiflora

Binomial name
- Aechmea geminiflora (Harms) L.B.Sm. & M.A.Spencer

Synonyms
- Streptocalyx geminiflorus Harms

Species of flowering plant

Aechmea geminiflora is a species of plant in the family Bromeliaceae. It is an epiphyte endemic to Tungurahua Province in Ecuador. Its natural habitat is subtropical or tropical moist montane forests. It is threatened by habitat loss.
