= Aechmea echinata =

Scientific classification
- Kingdom: Plantae
- Clade: Tracheophytes
- Clade: Angiosperms
- Clade: Monocots
- Clade: Commelinids
- Order: Poales
- Family: Bromeliaceae
- Genus: Aechmea
- Subgenus: Aechmea subg. Aechmea
- Species: A. echinata

Binomial name
- Aechmea echinata (Leme) Leme

Synonyms
- Wittrockia echinata Leme

Species of flowering plant

Aechmea echinata is a species of flowering plant in the genus Aechmea. This species is endemic to the State of Bahia in eastern Brazil.

The Latin specific epithet of echinata refers to hedgehog, from echinus.
