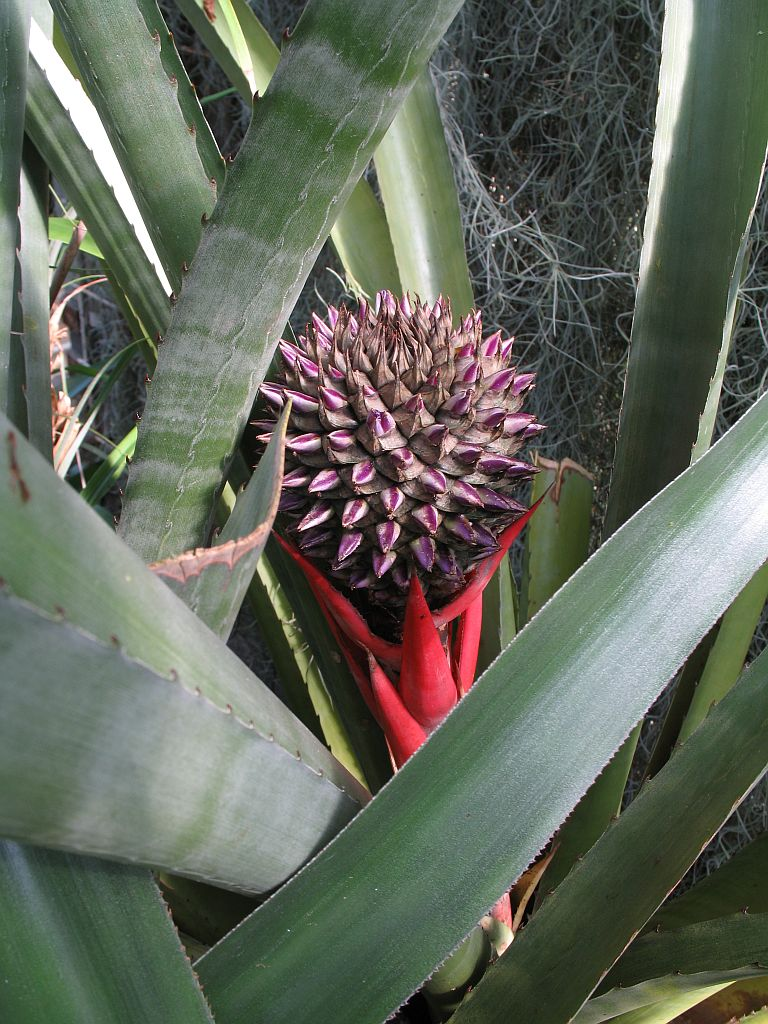

Scientific classification
- Kingdom: Plantae
- Clade: Tracheophytes
- Clade: Angiosperms
- Clade: Monocots
- Clade: Commelinids
- Order: Poales
- Family: Bromeliaceae
- Genus: Aechmea
- Subgenus: Aechmea subg. Aechmea
- Species: A. gigantea

Binomial name
- Aechmea gigantea Baker

Synonyms
- Hoplophytum giganteum E.Morren; Billbergia gigantea C.Chev.

= Aechmea gigantea =

Species of flowering plant

Aechmea gigantea is a plant species in the genus Aechmea. This species is endemic to Venezuela.
