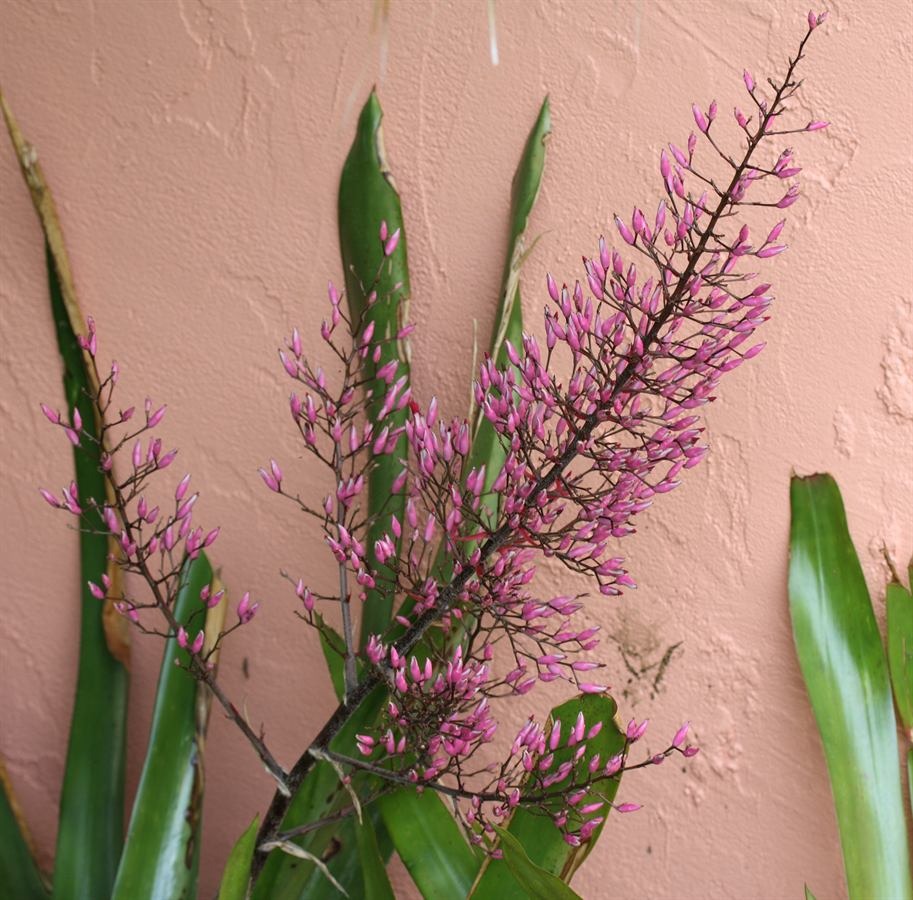

Scientific classification
- Kingdom: Plantae
- Clade: Tracheophytes
- Clade: Angiosperms
- Clade: Monocots
- Clade: Commelinids
- Order: Poales
- Family: Bromeliaceae
- Genus: Aechmea
- Subgenus: Aechmea subg. Aechmea
- Species: A. spectabilis

Binomial name
- Aechmea spectabilis Brongniart ex Houllet

Synonyms
- Pironneava spectabilis K.Koch; Aechmea flexuosa Baker; Aechmea hoeckelii Regel; Guzmania spectabilis Baker

= Aechmea spectabilis =

Species of flowering plant

Aechmea spectabilis is a plant species in the genus Aechmea. This species is native to Venezuela and Colombia.

== Cultivars ==
- Aechmea 'Lilac Cloud'
