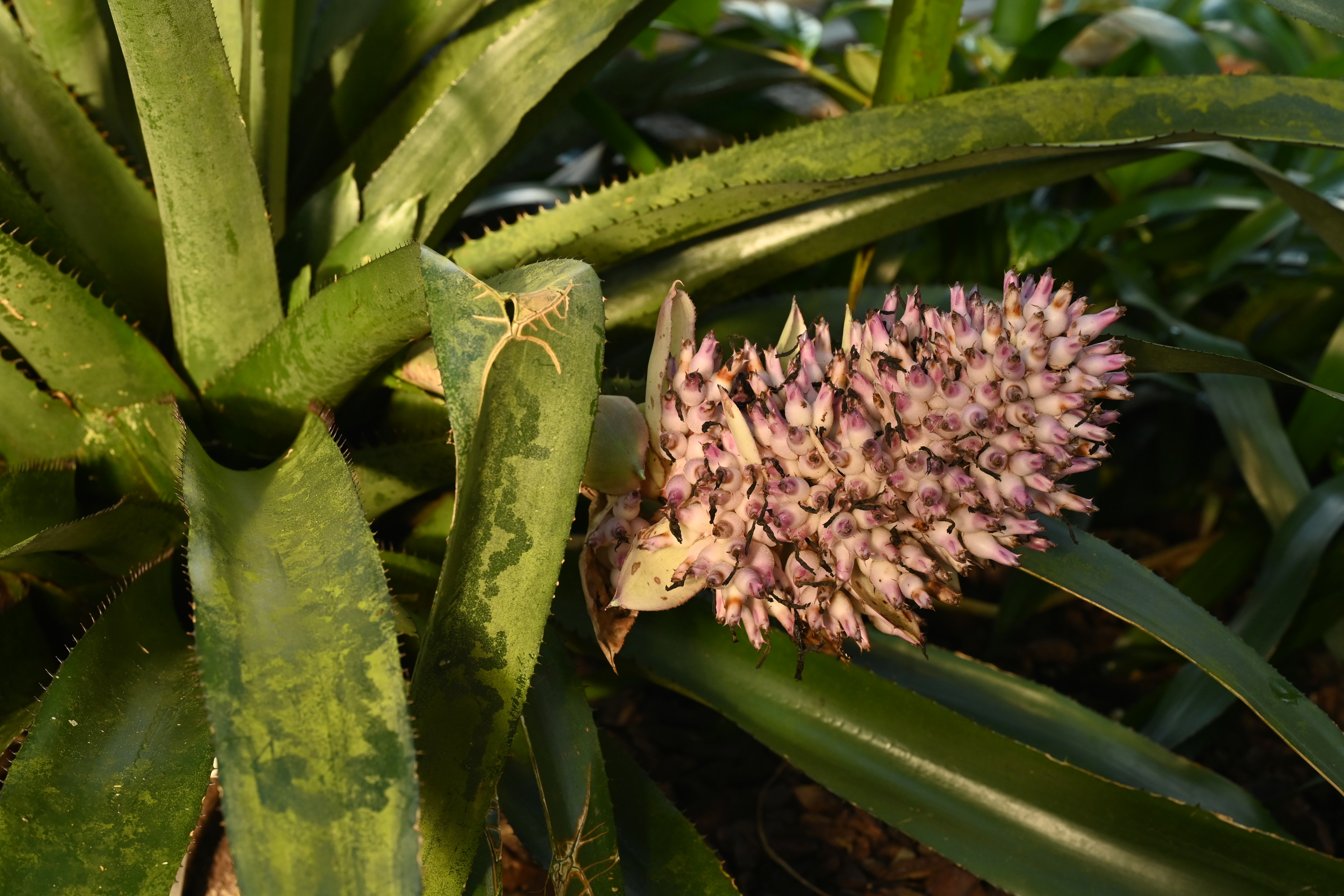

Scientific classification
- Kingdom: Plantae
- Clade: Embryophytes
- Clade: Tracheophytes
- Clade: Spermatophytes
- Clade: Angiosperms
- Clade: Monocots
- Clade: Commelinids
- Order: Poales
- Family: Bromeliaceae
- Genus: Aechmea
- Subgenus: Aechmea subg. Aechmea
- Species: A. macrochlamys

Binomial name
- Aechmea macrochlamys L.B.Sm.

= Aechmea macrochlamys =

Species of flowering plant

Aechmea macrochlamys is a plant species in the genus Aechmea. The species is endemic to the State of Espírito Santo in eastern Brazil.

== Cultivar ==
- Aechmea 'Purple Globe'
