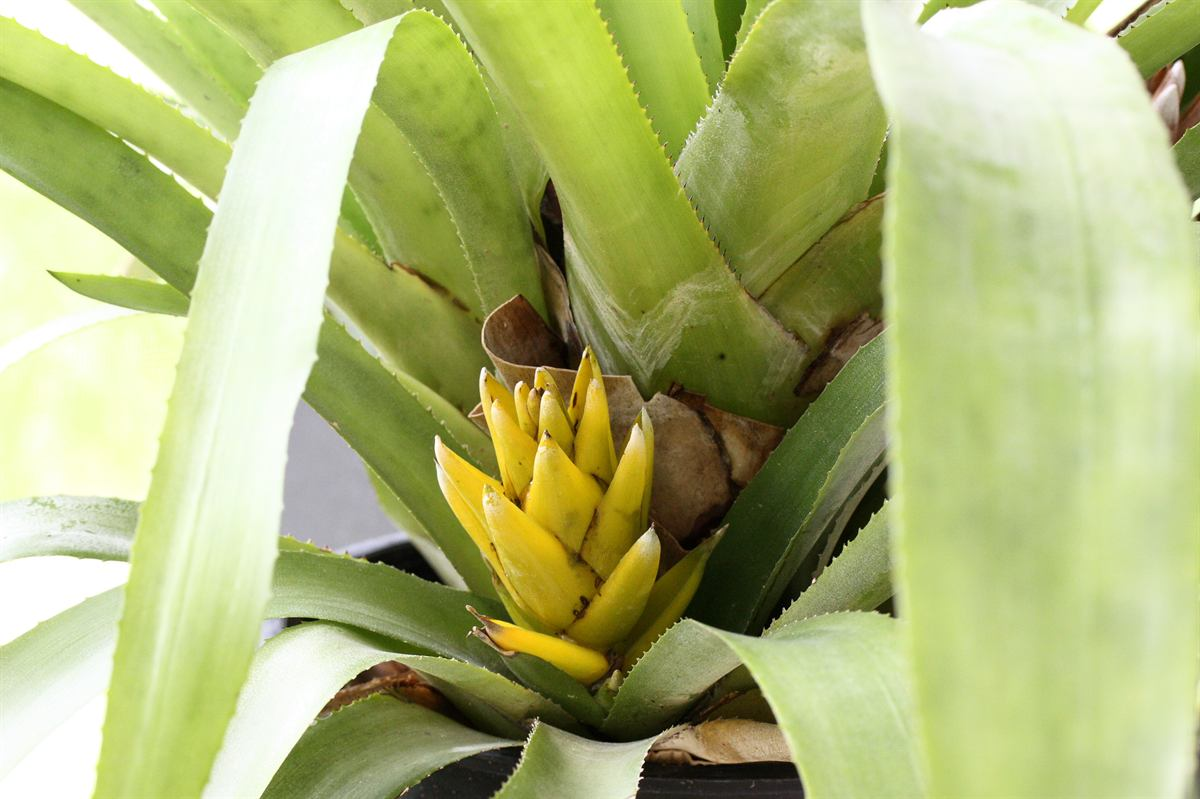

Scientific classification
- Kingdom: Plantae
- Clade: Tracheophytes
- Clade: Angiosperms
- Clade: Monocots
- Clade: Commelinids
- Order: Poales
- Family: Bromeliaceae
- Genus: Aechmea
- Subgenus: Aechmea subg. Aechmea
- Species: A. nidularioides

Binomial name
- Aechmea nidularioides L.B.Sm.

= Aechmea nidularioides =

Species of plant

Aechmea nidularioides is a plant species in the genus Aechmea. This species is native to Colombia, Ecuador, and Peru.

== Cultivars ==
- Aechmea 'Caprice'
- Aechmea 'Salvador'
