= Aechmea egleriana =

Scientific classification
- Kingdom: Plantae
- Clade: Tracheophytes
- Clade: Angiosperms
- Clade: Monocots
- Clade: Commelinids
- Order: Poales
- Family: Bromeliaceae
- Genus: Aechmea
- Subgenus: Aechmea subg. Aechmea
- Species: A. egleriana

Binomial name
- Aechmea egleriana L.B.Sm.

Species of flowering plant

Aechmea egleriana is a plant species in the genus Aechmea. This species is native to Venezuela, French Guiana and northern Brazil.
