= Aechmea lanata =

Scientific classification
- Kingdom: Plantae
- Clade: Tracheophytes
- Clade: Angiosperms
- Clade: Monocots
- Clade: Commelinids
- Order: Poales
- Family: Bromeliaceae
- Genus: Aechmea
- Species: A. lanata

Binomial name
- Aechmea lanata (L.B.Sm.) L.B.Sm. & M.A.Spencer

Species of flowering plant

Aechmea lanata is a species of flowering plant in the genus Aechmea. This species is endemic to the State of Bahia in eastern Brazil.
