= Aechmea prava =

Scientific classification
- Kingdom: Plantae
- Clade: Tracheophytes
- Clade: Angiosperms
- Clade: Monocots
- Clade: Commelinids
- Order: Poales
- Family: Bromeliaceae
- Genus: Aechmea
- Subgenus: Aechmea subg. Aechmea
- Species: A. prava

Binomial name
- Aechmea prava E. Pereira

Species of flowering plant

Aechmea prava is a plant species in the genus Aechmea. This species is endemic to the State of Rio de Janeiro in Brazil.
