= Aechmea floribunda =

Scientific classification
- Kingdom: Plantae
- Clade: Tracheophytes
- Clade: Angiosperms
- Clade: Monocots
- Clade: Commelinids
- Order: Poales
- Family: Bromeliaceae
- Genus: Aechmea
- Species: A. floribunda

Binomial name
- Aechmea floribunda Martius ex Schultes f.

Synonyms
- Pironneava floribunda (Mart. ex Schult. & Schult.f.) Wittm; Streptocalyx floribunda (Mart. ex Schult. & Schult.f.) Mez; Pironneava platynema Gaudich.; Hoplophytum platynema (Gaudich.) Beer; Hohenbergia platynema (Gaudich.) Baker; Aechmea platynema (Gaudich.) Baker; Streptocalyx platynema (Gaudich.) Lindm.

Species of flowering plant

Aechmea floribunda is a species of flowering plant in the genus Aechmea. This species is endemic to Brazil, known from the States of Espírito Santo and Rio de Janeiro.
