= Aechmea rubiginosa =

Scientific classification
- Kingdom: Plantae
- Clade: Embryophytes
- Clade: Tracheophytes
- Clade: Spermatophytes
- Clade: Angiosperms
- Clade: Monocots
- Clade: Commelinids
- Order: Poales
- Family: Bromeliaceae
- Genus: Aechmea
- Species: A. rubiginosa

Binomial name
- Aechmea rubiginosa Mez

Synonyms
- Chevaliera rubiginosa (Mez) L.B.Sm. & W.J.Kress

Species of flowering plant

Aechmea rubiginosa is a species of flowering plant in the family Bromeliaceae. This species is native to Venezuela, Colombia, Peru, and northern Brazil.
