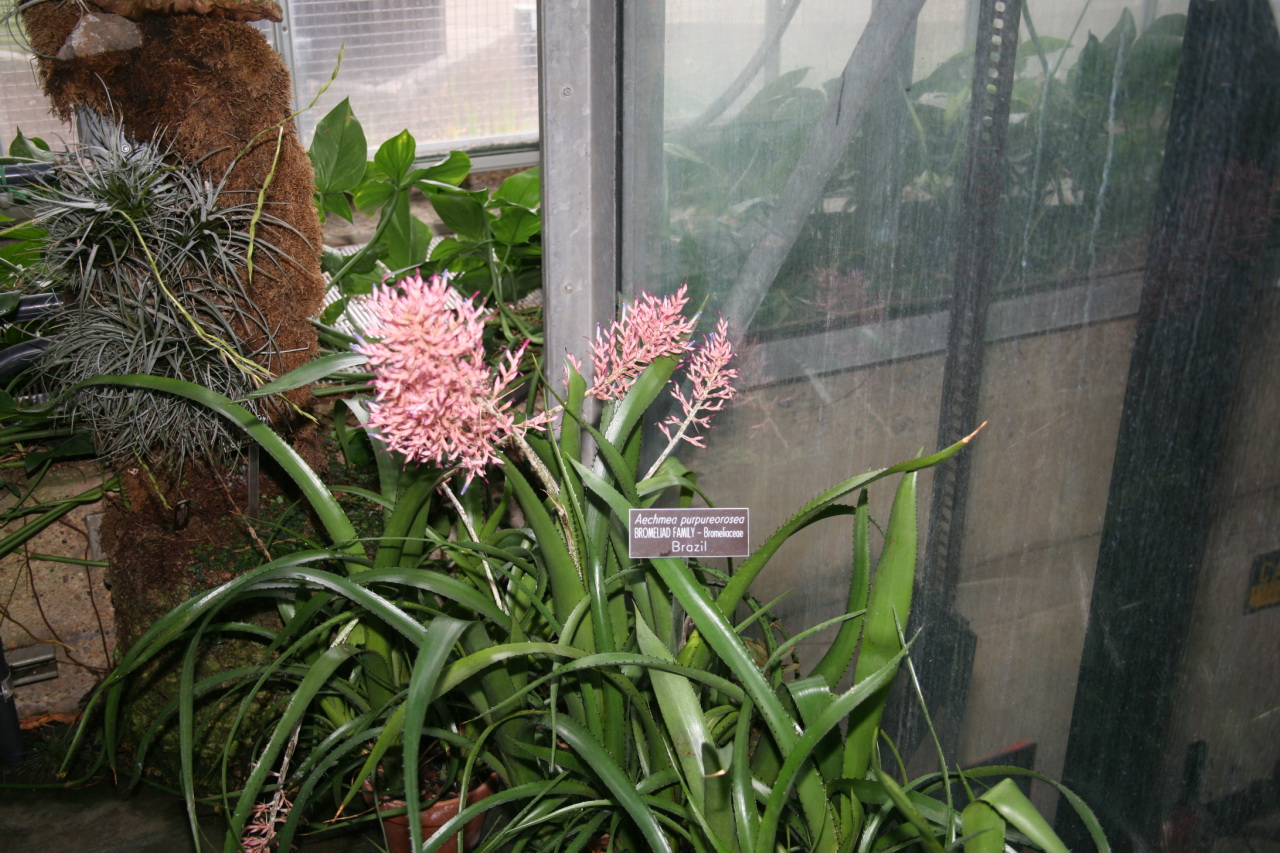

Scientific classification
- Kingdom: Plantae
- Clade: Tracheophytes
- Clade: Angiosperms
- Clade: Monocots
- Clade: Commelinids
- Order: Poales
- Family: Bromeliaceae
- Genus: Aechmea
- Subgenus: Aechmea subg. Aechmea
- Species: A. purpureorosea

Binomial name
- Aechmea purpureorosea (Hooker) Wawra

Synonyms
- Billbergia purpureorosea Hook.; Aechmea suaveolens Knowles & Westc.; Bromelia alborosea Lem.; Hoplophytum purpureoroseum Beer; Hoplophytum suaveolens (Knowles & Westc.) Beer; Aechmea rosea Baker; Aechmea suaveolens var. longifolia Wittm.

= Aechmea purpureorosea =

Species of flowering plant

Aechmea purpureorosea is a plant species in the genus Aechmea. This species is endemic to southeastern Brazil, States of Minas Gerais and Rio de Janeiro.
