= Aechmea fuerstenbergii =

Scientific classification
- Kingdom: Plantae
- Clade: Tracheophytes
- Clade: Angiosperms
- Clade: Monocots
- Clade: Commelinids
- Order: Poales
- Family: Bromeliaceae
- Genus: Aechmea
- Species: A. fuerstenbergii

Binomial name
- Aechmea fuerstenbergii E.Morren & Wittmack

Synonyms
- Streptocalyx fuerstenbergii (E.Morren & Wittm.) E.Morren

Species of plant

Aechmea fuerstenbergii is a species of flowering plant in the genus Aechmea. This species is native to Peru and Bolivia.
