= Aechmea catendensis =

Scientific classification
- Kingdom: Plantae
- Clade: Tracheophytes
- Clade: Angiosperms
- Clade: Monocots
- Clade: Commelinids
- Order: Poales
- Family: Bromeliaceae
- Genus: Aechmea
- Subgenus: Aechmea subg. Aechmea
- Species: A. catendensis

Binomial name
- Aechmea catendensis J.A.Siqueira & Leme

Species of flowering plant

Aechmea catendensis is a species of flowering plant in the genus Aechmea. This species is endemic to Brazil.
