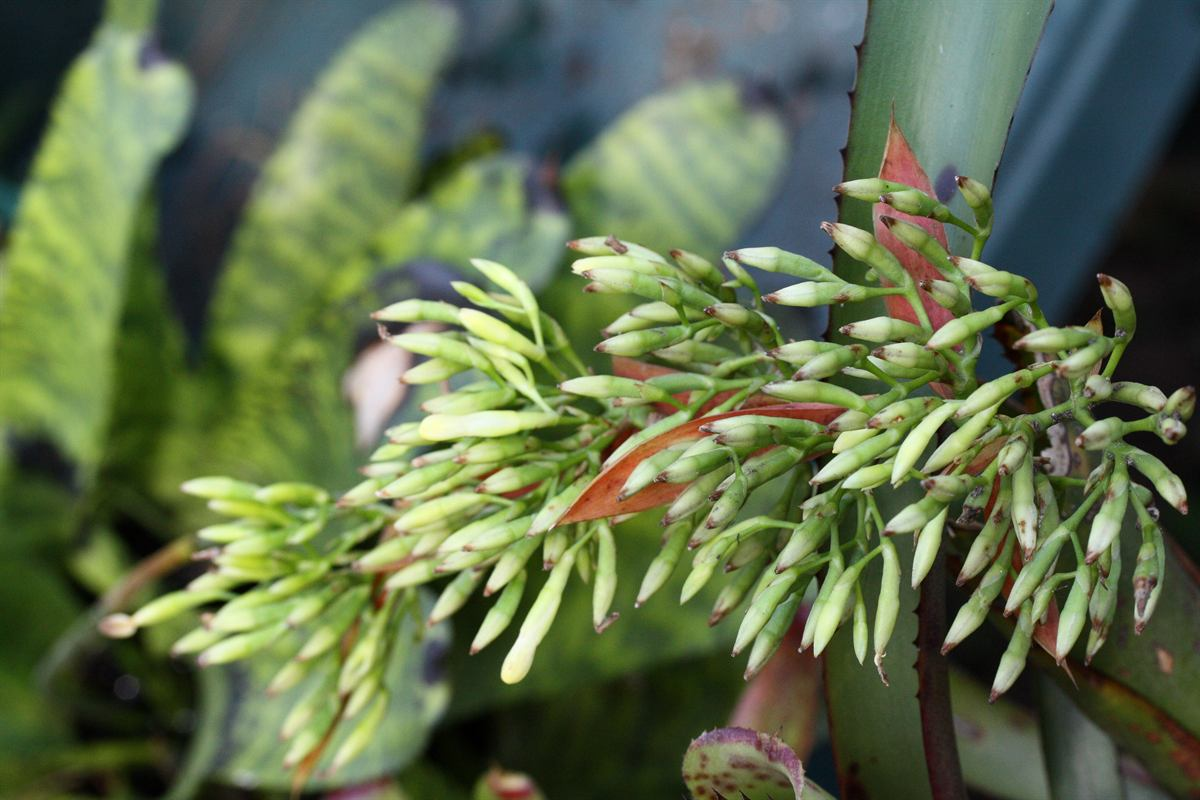

Scientific classification
- Kingdom: Plantae
- Clade: Tracheophytes
- Clade: Angiosperms
- Clade: Monocots
- Clade: Commelinids
- Order: Poales
- Family: Bromeliaceae
- Genus: Aechmea
- Species: A. correia-araujoi

Binomial name
- Aechmea correia-araujoi E.Pereira & Moutinho

= Aechmea correia-araujoi =

Species of flowering plant

Aechmea correia-araujoi is a species of flowering plant in the genus Aechmea. This species is endemic to the State of Bahia in eastern Brazil.

== Cultivars ==
- Aechmea 'Haiku'
