= Aechmea werdermannii =

Scientific classification
- Kingdom: Plantae
- Clade: Tracheophytes
- Clade: Angiosperms
- Clade: Monocots
- Clade: Commelinids
- Order: Poales
- Family: Bromeliaceae
- Genus: Aechmea
- Subgenus: Aechmea subg. Aechmea
- Species: A. werdermannii

Binomial name
- Aechmea werdermannii Harms

Species of flowering plant

Aechmea werdermannii is a plant species in the genus Aechmea. This species is endemic to eastern Brazil, known from the States of Pernambuco and Alagoas.
