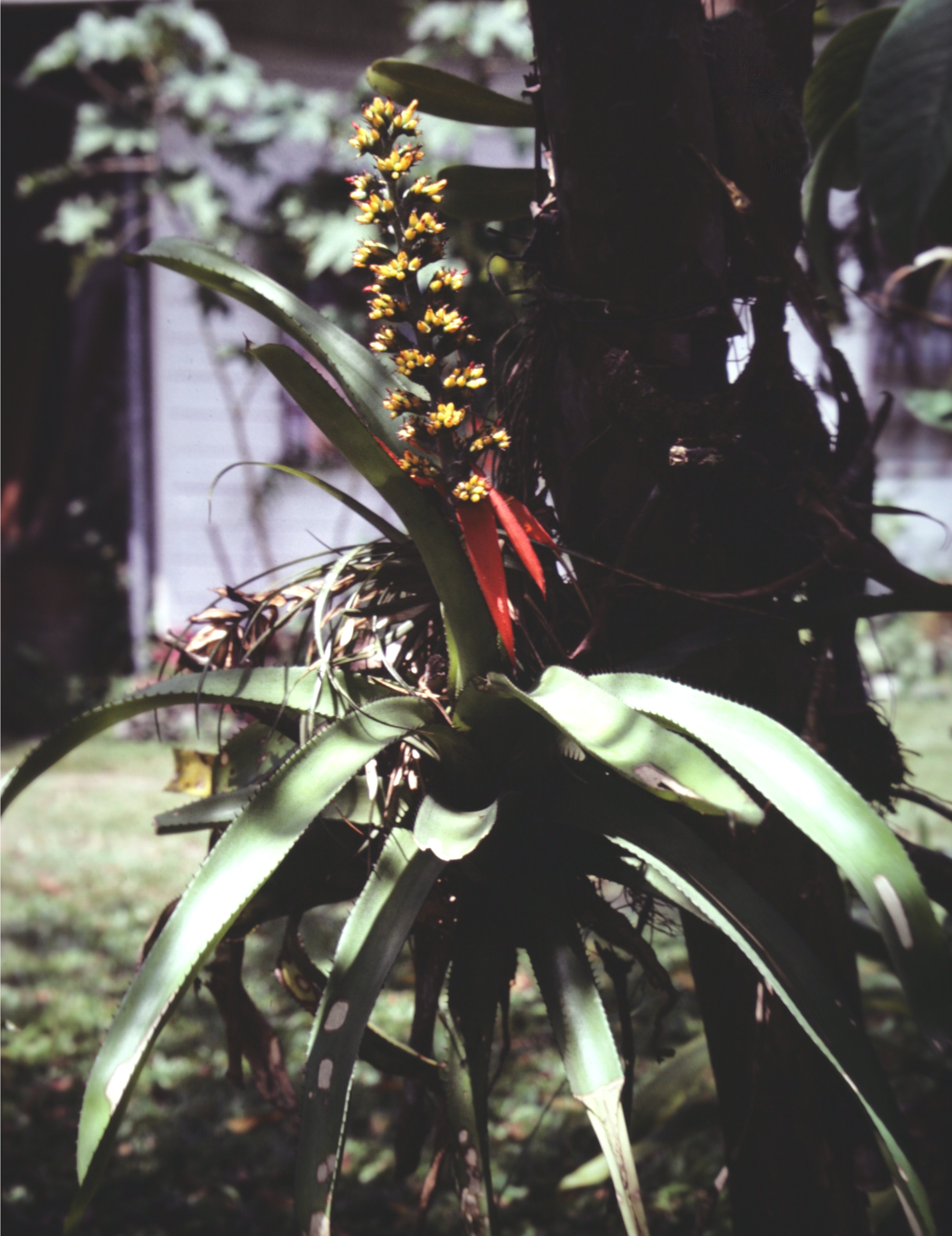

Scientific classification
- Kingdom: Plantae
- Clade: Tracheophytes
- Clade: Angiosperms
- Clade: Monocots
- Clade: Commelinids
- Order: Poales
- Family: Bromeliaceae
- Genus: Aechmea
- Subgenus: Aechmea subg. Aechmea
- Species: A. mertensii

Binomial name
- Aechmea mertensii (G.Meyer) Schultes f.

Synonyms
- Bromelia mertensii G.Mey.; Billbergia mertensii (G.Mey.) Miq.; Hoplophytum mertensii (G.Mey.) Beer; Hohenbergia mertensii (G.Mey.) Baker; Aechmea spicata Mart. ex Schult. & Schult.f. in J.J.Roemer & J.A.Schultes; Bromelia thyrsiflora Willd. ex Schult. & Schult.f.; Aechmea mucroniflora Hook.; Hoplophytum mucroniflora (Hook.) Beer; Hoplophytum spicatum (Mart. ex Schult. & Schult.f.) Beer; Hohenbergia martii Baker; Hohenbergia mucroniflora (Hook.) Baker; Hohenbergia spicata (Mart. ex Schult. & Schult.f.) Baker; Aechmea wullschlaegeliana Mez; Aechmea humilis Mez

= Aechmea mertensii =

Species of flowering plant

Aechmea mertensii is a plant species in the genus Aechmea. This species is native to Bolivia, Brazil, Colombia, Ecuador, Guyana, French Guiana, Peru, Suriname, and Venezuela.
