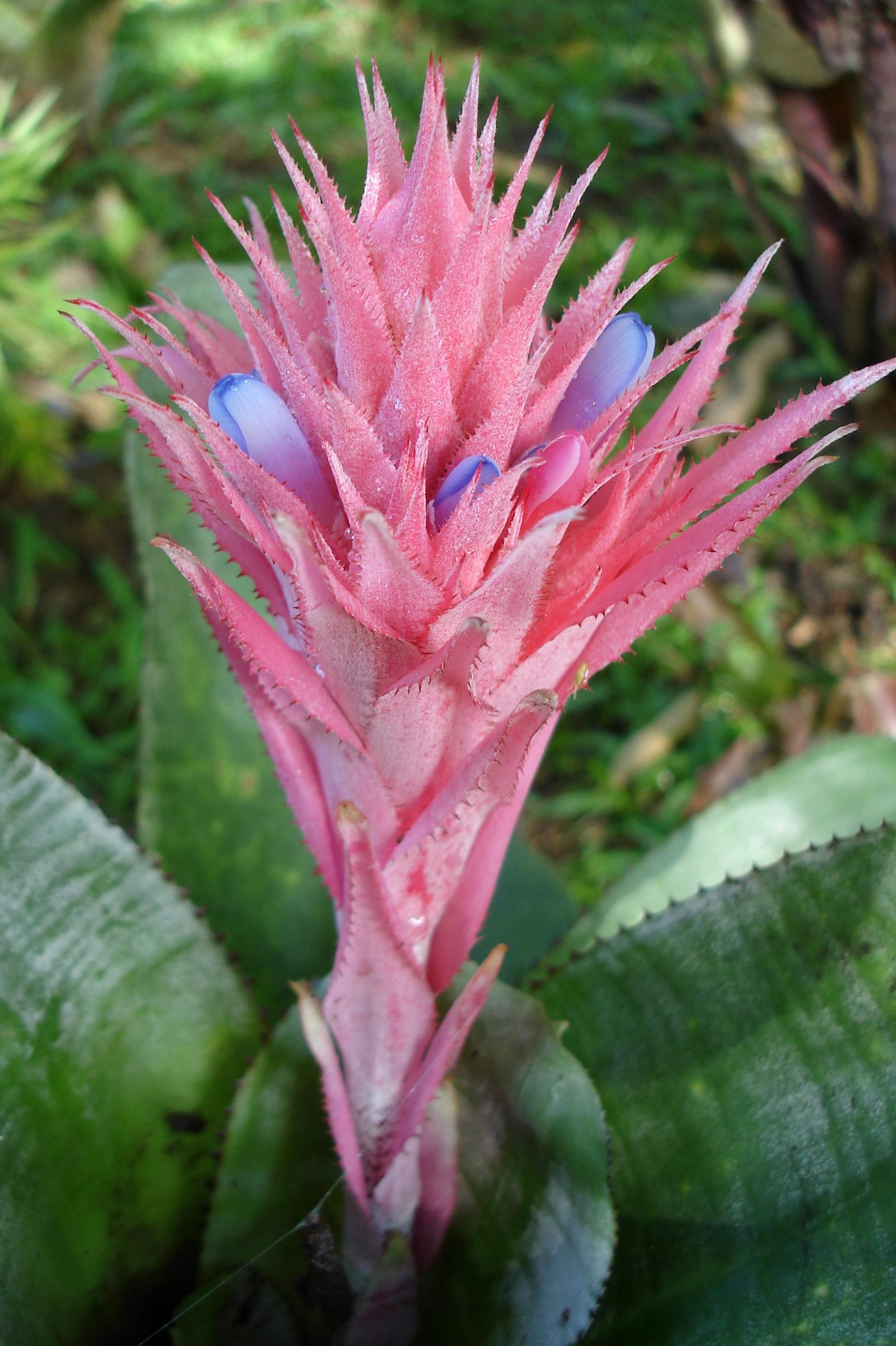
- Aechmea fasciata inflorescence

Scientific classification
- Kingdom: Plantae
- Clade: Tracheophytes
- Clade: Angiosperms
- Clade: Monocots
- Clade: Commelinids
- Order: Poales
- Family: Bromeliaceae
- Subfamily: Bromelioideae
- Genus: Aechmea; Ruiz & Pav.

Species
- Over 250, see text.

Synonyms
- Echinostachys Brongn. ex Planch.; Gravisia Mez; Hoplophytum Beer; Pothuava Gaudich.; Streptocalyx Beer

= Aechmea =

Genus of flowering plants

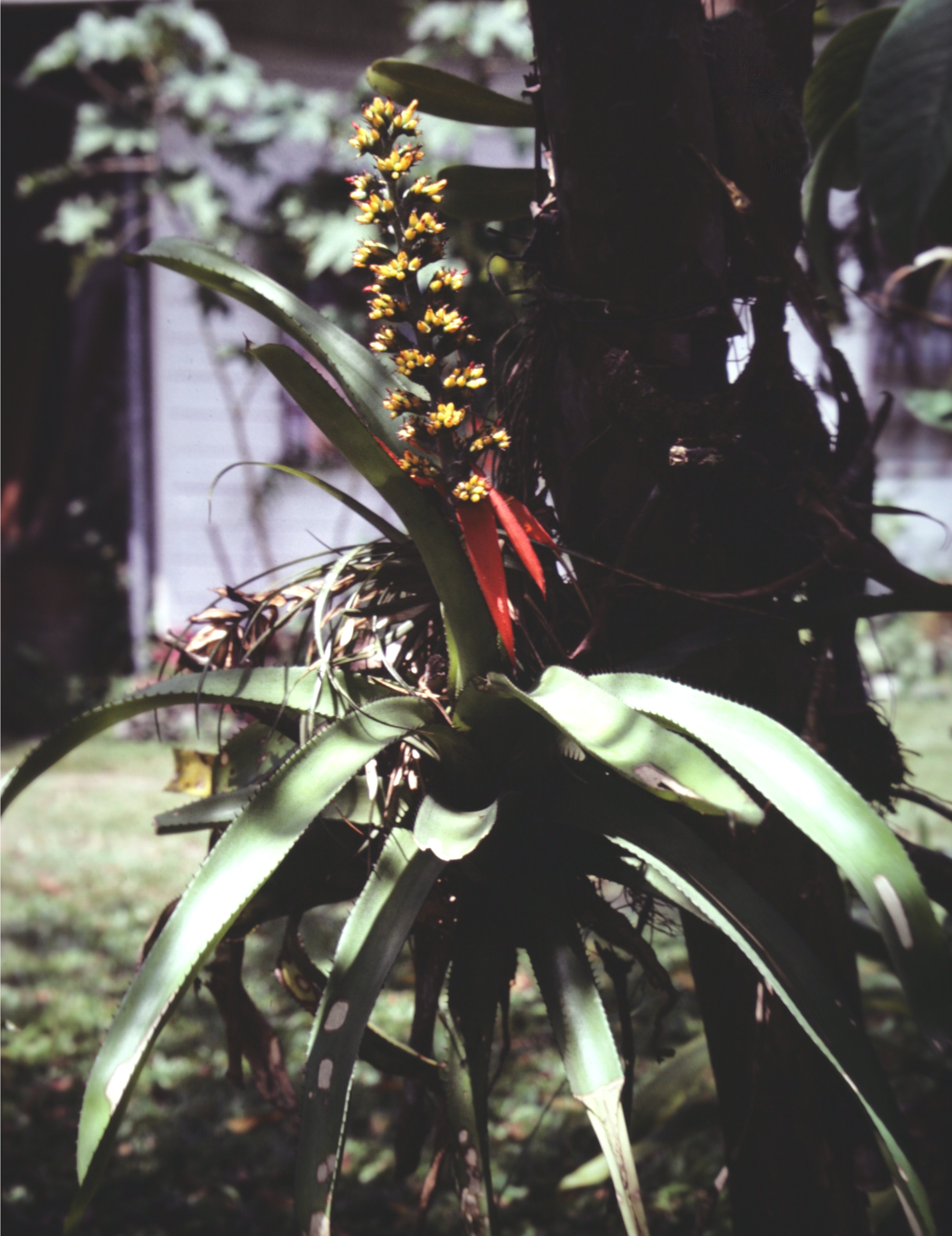
Aechmea mertensii

Aechmea is a genus of flowering plants in the family Bromeliaceae (subfamily Bromelioideae). The name comes from the Greek aichme, meaning "spear". Suggested pronunciations include EEK-me-ə and eek-MEE-ə. Aechmea comprises eight subgenera and around 250 species distributed from Mexico through South America and the Caribbean. Most of the species in this genus are epiphytes.

== Subgenera ==
Subgenera include:

- Aechmea subg. Aechmea Baker
- Aechmea subg. Chevaliera (Gaudichaud ex Beer) Baker
- Aechmea subg. Lamprococcus (Beer) Baker
- Aechmea subg. Macrochordion (De Vriese) Baker
- Aechmea subg. Ortgiesia (Regel) Mez
- Aechmea subg. Platyaechmea (Baker) Baker
- Aechmea subg. Podaechmea Mez
- Aechmea subg. Pothuava (Baker) Baker
- Aechmea subg. Streptocalyx ined.

== Species ==
As of November 2022, Plants of the World Online listed the following species:

- Aechmea abbreviata L.B.Sm.
- Aechmea aculeatosepala (Rauh & Barthlott) Leme
- Aechmea aenigmatica López-Ferr., Espejo, Ceja & A.Mend.
- Aechmea aguadocensis Leme & L.Kollmann
- Aechmea aiuruocensis Leme
- Aechmea alba Mez
- Aechmea alegrensis W.Weber
- Aechmea alopecurus Mez
- Aechmea amicorum B.R.Silva & H.Luther
- Aechmea ampla L.B.Sm.
- Aechmea andaquiensis Betancur & Aguirre-Santoro
- Aechmea andersonii H.Luther & Leme
- Aechmea angustifolia Poepp. & Endl.
- Aechmea anomala L.B.Sm.
- Aechmea apocalyptica Reitz
- Aechmea aquilega (Salisb.) Griseb.
- Aechmea araneosa L.B.Sm.
- Aechmea arenaria (Ule) L.B.Sm. & M.A.Spencer
- Aechmea aripoensis (N.E.Br.) Pittendr.
- Aechmea atrovittata Leme & J.A.Siqueira
- Aechmea avaldoana Leme & W.Till
- Aechmea azurea L.B.Sm.
- Aechmea bahiana L.B.Sm.
- Aechmea bambusoides L.B.Sm. & Reitz
- Aechmea baudoensis Aguirre-Santoro & Betancur
- Aechmea bauxilumii Áng.Fernández
- Aechmea biflora (L.B.Sm.) L.B.Sm. & M.A.Spencer
- Aechmea blanchetiana (Baker) L.B.Sm.
- Aechmea blumenavii Reitz
- Aechmea bocainensis E.Pereira & Leme
- Aechmea brachystachys (Harms) L.B.Sm. & M.A.Spencer
- Aechmea bracteata (Sw.) Griseb.
- Aechmea brassicoides Baker
- Aechmea brevicollis L.B.Sm.
- Aechmea bromeliifolia (Rudge) Baker ex Benth. & Hook.f.
- Aechmea bruggeri Leme
- Aechmea caesia É.Morren ex Baker
- Aechmea callichroma Read & Baensch
- Aechmea calyculata (É.Morren) Baker
- Aechmea campanulata L.B.Sm.
- Aechmea candida É.Morren ex Baker
- Aechmea capixabae L.B.Sm.
- Aechmea cardenasii Aguirre-Santoro & Betancur
- Aechmea cariocae L.B.Sm.
- Aechmea carvalhoi E.Pereira & Leme
- Aechmea castanea L.B.Sm.
- Aechmea castelnavii Baker
- Aechmea catendensis J.A.Siqueira & Leme
- Aechmea cathcartii C.F.Reed & Read
- Aechmea caudata Lindm.
- Aechmea cephaloides J.A.Siqueira & Leme
- Aechmea chantinii (Carrière) Baker
- Aechmea coelestis (K.Koch) É.Morren
- Aechmea colombiana (L.B.Sm.) L.B.Sm. & M.A.Spencer
- Aechmea comata (Gaudich.) Baker
- Aechmea confertiflora Aguirre-Santoro & Betancur
- Aechmea confusa H.Luther
- Aechmea conifera L.B.Sm.
- Aechmea contracta (Mart. ex Schult. & Schult.f.) Baker
- Aechmea correia-araujoi E.Pereira & Moutinho
- Aechmea corymbosa (Mart. ex Schult. & Schult.f.) Mez
- Aechmea costantinii (Mez) L.B.Sm.
- Aechmea cucullata H.Luther
- Aechmea cylindrata Lindm.
- Aechmea cymosopaniculata Baker
- Aechmea dactylina Baker
- Aechmea dealbata É.Morren ex Baker
- Aechmea decurva Proctor
- Aechmea dichlamydea Baker
- Aechmea digitata L.B.Sm. & Read
- Aechmea discordiae Leme
- Aechmea disjuncta (L.B.Sm.) Leme & J.A.Siqueira
- Aechmea distichantha Lem.
- Aechmea downsiana Pittendr.
- Aechmea echinata (Leme) Leme
- Aechmea egleriana L.B.Sm.
- Aechmea emmerichiae Leme
- Aechmea entringeri Leme
- Aechmea esseri Gross & Rauh
- Aechmea eurycorymbus Harms
- Aechmea farinosa (Regel) L.B.Sm.
- Aechmea fasciata (Lindl.) Baker
- Aechmea fendleri André ex Mez
- Aechmea fernandae (É.Morren) Baker
- Aechmea ferruginea L.B.Sm.
- Aechmea filicaulis (Griseb.) Mez
- Aechmea flavorosea E.Pereira
- Aechmea flemingii H.Luther
- Aechmea floribunda Mart. ex Schult. & Schult.f.
- Aechmea fosteriana L.B.Sm.
- Aechmea frassyi Leme & J.A.Siqueira
- Aechmea fraudulosa Mez
- Aechmea fuerstenbergii É.Morren & Wittm.
- Aechmea fulgens Brongn.
- Aechmea gamosepala Wittm.
- Aechmea geminiflora (Harms) L.B.Sm. & M.A.Spencer
- Aechmea gentryi H.Luther & K.F.Norton
- Aechmea gigantea Baker
- Aechmea glandulosa Leme
- Aechmea gracilis Lindm.
- Aechmea grazielae Martinelli & Leme
- Aechmea guainumbiorum J.A.Siqueira & Leme
- Aechmea guaratingensis Leme & L.Kollmann
- Aechmea gurkeniana E.Pereira & Moutinho
- Aechmea haltonii H.Luther
- Aechmea hellae W.Weber
- Aechmea heterosepala Leme
- Aechmea hoppii (Harms) L.B.Sm.
- Aechmea huebneri Harms
- Aechmea iguana Wittm.
- Aechmea itapoana W.Till & Morowetz
- Aechmea joannis Strehl
- Aechmea jungurudoensis H.Luther & K.F.Norton
- Aechmea kautskyana E.Pereira & L.B.Sm.
- Aechmea kentii (H.Luther) L.B.Sm. & M.A.Spencer
- Aechmea kertesziae Reitz
- Aechmea kleinii Reitz
- Aechmea koesteri Manzan.
- Aechmea kuntzeana Mez, syn. of Aechmea longicuspis var. kuntzeana (Mez) Gouda
- Aechmea lactifera Leme & J.A.Siqueira
- Aechmea lamarchei Mez
- Aechmea lanata (L.B.Sm.) L.B.Sm. & M.A.Spencer
- Aechmea lanjouwii (L.B.Sm.) L.B.Sm.
- Aechmea lasseri L.B.Sm.
- Aechmea latifolia (Willd. ex Schult. & Schult.f.) Klotzsch ex Mez
- Aechmea leonard-kentiana H.Luther & Leme
- Aechmea leppardii Philcox
- Aechmea leptantha (Harms) Leme & J.A.Siqueira
- Aechmea leucolepis L.B.Sm.
- Aechmea lilacinantha Leme
- Aechmea longicuspis Baker
- Aechmea longifolia (Rudge) L.B.Sm. & M.A.Spencer
- Aechmea longipedunculata Betancur & Aguirre-Santoro
- Aechmea longiramosa Betancur & Aguirre-Santoro
- Aechmea lueddemanniana (K.Koch) Mez
- Aechmea lugoi (Gilmartin & H.Luther) L.B.Sm. & M.A.Spencer
- Aechmea lymanii W.Weber
- Aechmea maasii Gouda & W.Till
- Aechmea macrochlamys L.B.Sm.
- Aechmea maculata L.B.Sm.
- Aechmea magdalenae (André) André ex Baker
- Aechmea manzanaresiana H.Luther
- Aechmea marauensis Leme
- Aechmea marginalis Leme & J.A.Siqueira
- Aechmea mariae-reginae H.Wendl.
- Aechmea matudae L.B.Sm.
- Aechmea mcvaughii L.B.Sm.
- Aechmea melinonii Hook.
- Aechmea mertensii (G.Mey.) Schult. & Schult.f.
- Aechmea mexicana Baker
- Aechmea milsteiniana L.B.Sm. & Read
- Aechmea miniata (Beer) Baker
- Aechmea mira Leme & H.Luther
- Aechmea mollis L.B.Sm.
- Aechmea moonenii Gouda
- Aechmea moorei H.Luther
- Aechmea mulfordii L.B.Sm.
- Aechmea murcae (L.B.Sm.) L.B.Sm. & M.A.Spencer
- Aechmea muricata (Arruda) L.B.Sm.
- Aechmea mutica L.B.Sm.
- Aechmea nallyi L.B.Sm.
- Aechmea napoensis L.B.Sm. & M.A.Spencer
- Aechmea nidularioides L.B.Sm.
- Aechmea nivea L.B.Sm.
- Aechmea novoae Flores-Arg., López-Ferr. & Espejo
- Aechmea nudicaulis (L.) Griseb.
- Aechmea organensis Wawra
- Aechmea orlandiana L.B.Sm.
- Aechmea ornata (Gaudich.) Baker
- Aechmea pabstii E.Pereira & Moutinho
- Aechmea pallida L.B.Sm.
- Aechmea paniculata Ruiz & Pav.
- Aechmea paniculigera (Sw.) Griseb.
- Aechmea paradoxa (Leme) Leme
- Aechmea paratiensis Leme & Fraga
- Aechmea patriciae H.Luther
- Aechmea pectinata Baker
- Aechmea pedicellata Leme & H.Luther
- Aechmea penduliflora André
- Aechmea perforata L.B.Sm.
- Aechmea phanerophlebia Baker
- Aechmea pimenti-velosoi Reitz
- Aechmea pineliana (Brongn. ex Planch.) Baker
- Aechmea pittieri Mez
- Aechmea podantha L.B.Sm.
- Aechmea poitaei (Baker) L.B.Sm. & M.A.Spencer
- Aechmea politii L.B.Sm.
- Aechmea polyantha E.Pereira & Reitz
- Aechmea prancei L.B.Sm.
- Aechmea prava E.Pereira
- Aechmea pseudonudicaulis Leme
- Aechmea pubescens Baker
- Aechmea purpureorosea (Hook.) Wawra
- Aechmea pyramidalis Benth.
- Aechmea racinae L.B.Sm.
- Aechmea ramosa Mart. ex Schult. & Schult.f.
- Aechmea ramusculosa Leme
- Aechmea reclinata Sastre & Brithmer
- Aechmea recurvata (Klotzsch) L.B.Sm.
- Aechmea recurvipetala Leme & L.Kollmann
- Aechmea retusa L.B.Sm.
- Aechmea roberto-anselmoi E.Pereira & Leme
- Aechmea roberto-seidelii E.Pereira
- Aechmea rodriguesiana (L.B.Sm.) L.B.Sm.
- Aechmea roeseliae H.Luther
- Aechmea romeroi L.B.Sm.
- Aechmea rubens (L.B.Sm.) L.B.Sm.
- Aechmea rubiginosa Mez
- Aechmea rubroaristata Leme & Fraga
- Aechmea rubrolilacina Leme
- Aechmea seideliana W.Weber
- Aechmea seidelii (Leme) L.B.Sm. & M.A.Spencer
- Aechmea sergipana E.Pereira & Leme
- Aechmea serragrandensis Leme & J.A.Siqueira
- Aechmea serrata (L.) Mez
- Aechmea servitensis André
- Aechmea setigera Mart. ex Schult. & Schult.f.
- Aechmea smithiorum Mez
- Aechmea spectabilis (K.Koch) Brongn. ex Houllet
- Aechmea sphaerocephala (Gaudich.) Baker
- Aechmea squarrosa Baker
- Aechmea stelligera L.B.Sm.
- Aechmea stenosepala L.B.Sm.
- Aechmea streptocalycoides Philcox
- Aechmea strobilacea L.B.Sm.
- Aechmea strobilina (Beurl.) L.B.Sm. & Read
- Aechmea sucreana Martinelli & C.M.Vieira
- Aechmea sumidourensis Leme
- Aechmea tayoensis Gilmartin
- Aechmea tessmannii Harms
- Aechmea tillandsioides (Mart. ex Schult. & Schult.f.) Baker
- Aechmea timida Leme
- Aechmea tocantina Baker
- Aechmea tomentosa Mez
- Aechmea triangularis L.B.Sm.
- Aechmea triticina Mez
- Aechmea tuitensis Magaña & E.J.Lott
- Aechmea vallerandii (Carrière) Erhardt, Götz & Seybold
- Aechmea vanhoutteana (Van Houtte) Mez
- Aechmea vasquezii H.Luther
- Aechmea victoriana L.B.Sm.
- Aechmea viridipetala A.F.Costa & Amorim
- Aechmea warasii E.Pereira
- Aechmea weberi (E.Pereira & Leme) Leme
- Aechmea weilbachii Didr.
- Aechmea werdermannii Harms
- Aechmea williamsii (L.B.Sm.) L.B.Sm. & M.A.Spencer
- Aechmea winkleri Reitz
- Aechmea wittmackiana (Regel) Mez
- Aechmea woronowii Harms
- Aechmea xinguana A.K.Koch, Ilk.-Borg. & Forzza
- Aechmea zebrina L.B.Sm.

=== Transferred ===
- Aechmea bicolor L.B.Sm. → Wittmackia bicolor (L.B.Sm.) Aguirre-Santoroo
- Aechmea burle-marxii E.Pereira → Wittmackia burle-marxii (E.Pereira) Aguirre-Santoro
- Aechmea depressa L.B.Sm. → Karawata depressa (L.B.Sm.) J.R.Maciel & G.M.Sousa
- Aechmea gustavoi J.A.Siqueira & Leme → Karawata gustavoi (J.A.Siqueira & Leme) J.R.Maciel & G.M.Sousa
- Aechmea hostilis E.Pereira → Karawata hostilis (E.Pereira) J.R.Maciel & G.M.Sousa
- Aechmea involucrata André → Ronnbergia involucrata (André) Aguirre-Santoro
- Aechmea multiflora L.B.Sm. → Karawata multiflora (L.B.Sm.) J.R.Maciel & G.M.Sousa
- Aechmea nigribracteata J.R.Maciel, Louzada & M.Alves → Karawata nigribracteata (J.R.Maciel, Louzada & M.Alves) J.R.Maciel & G.M.Sousa
- Aechmea prasinata G.M.Sousa & Wand. → Karawata prasinata (G.M.Sousa & Wand.) J.R.Maciel & G.M.Sousa
- Aechmea saxicola L.B.Sm. → Karawata saxicola (L.B.Sm.) J.R.Maciel & G.M.Sousa
- Aechmea tonduzii Mez & Pittier → Ronnbergia tonduzii (Mez & Pittier) Aguirre-Santoro
- Aechmea turbinocalyx Mez → Wittmackia turbinocalyx (Mez) Aguirre-Santoro
- Aechmea veitchii Baker → Ronnbergia veitchii (Baker) Aguirre-Santoro

== Cultivars ==
Cultivars include:

- Aechmea 'Blue Tango'
- Aechmea 'Burgundy'
- Aechmea 'Fire'
- Aechmea 'Gympie Gold'
- Aechmea 'Jeanie'
- Aechmea 'Malva'
