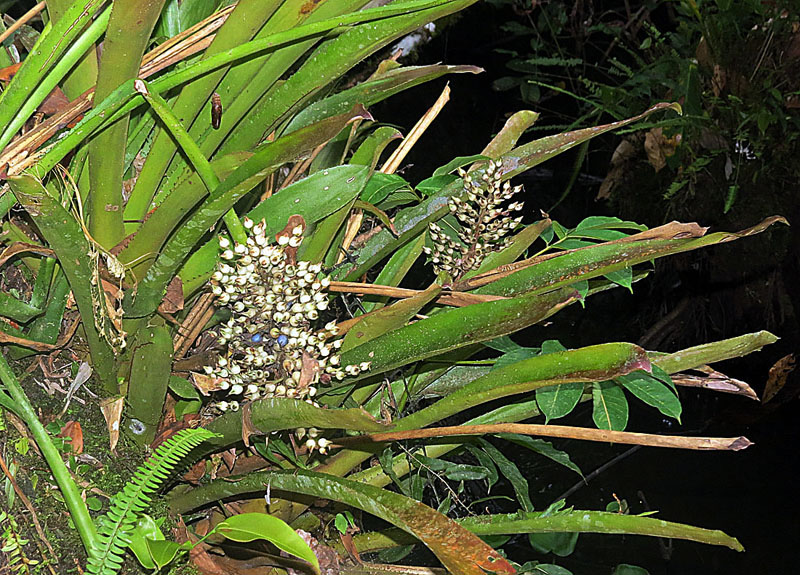

Scientific classification
- Kingdom: Plantae
- Clade: Tracheophytes
- Clade: Angiosperms
- Clade: Monocots
- Clade: Commelinids
- Order: Poales
- Family: Bromeliaceae
- Genus: Aechmea
- Subgenus: Aechmea subg. Aechmea
- Species: A. angustifolia

Binomial name
- Aechmea angustifolia Poeppig & Endlicher

Synonyms
- Hoplophytum angustifolium (Poepp. & Endl.) Beer; Hohenbergia angustifolia (Poepp. & Endl.) Baker; Aechmea cumingii Baker; Aechmea leucocarpa André; Aechmea eggersii Mez; Aechmea boliviana Rusby; Aechmea cylindrica Mez; Aechmea inconspicua Harms; Aechmea dryanderae Harms; Aechmea andradei Gilmartin

= Aechmea angustifolia =

Species of flowering plant

Aechmea angustifolia is a plant species in the genus Aechmea. This species is native to Central America and northern South America (Bolivia, Ecuador, Colombia, Venezuela, Guyana, Peru, northern Brazil).

== Cultivars ==
The species is widely cultivated as an ornamental. Cultivars include:

- Aechmea 'Brimstone'
- Aechmea 'El Morro'
- Aechmea 'Hellfire'
- Aechmea 'La Espriella'
- Aechmea 'Regine de Ligne'
