= Mulford B. Foster =

American botanist (1888–1978)

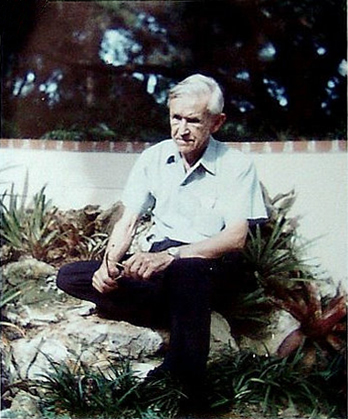
- Born: December 25, 1888; Elmer, New Jersey, US
- Died: August 28, 1978 (aged 89); Orlando, Florida, US
- Known for: Discovery of over 170 species of bromeliads including: Gravisia fosteriana, Aechmea ramosa var. festiva, Aechmea servitensis var. exigua to name a few. Contributions to bromeliad hybridization and cultivation.
- Awards: Herbert Medal for amaryllids (1951), Citation from the American Horticultural Society for contributions to the knowledge of bromeliads (1962)
- Scientific career
- Fields: Horticulture, Botany, Landscape Architecture, Artist, Philosopher, Collector

Signature
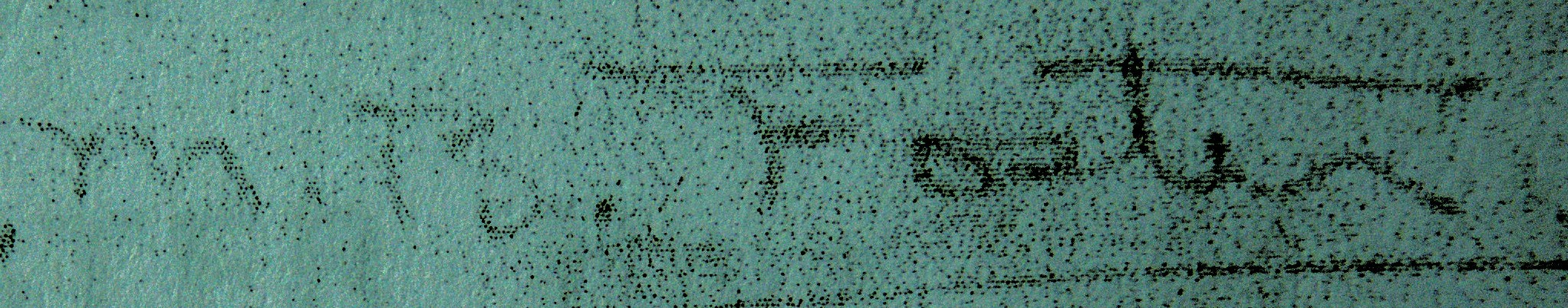

Mulford Bateman Foster (December 25, 1888 – August 28, 1978) was an American botanist known by many as the "Father of the Bromeliad" as he was instrumental in the discovery and introduction of many new species of Bromeliad to the United States. He also devoted his life to hybridizing and contributed widely to the knowledge of the plant species. He was a man of many talents including naturalist, explorer, writer, photographer, artist, horticulturist and a well-respected landscape architect in Florida. Numerous bromeliad plants found today are named after various Foster family members and the genus Fosterella is named in honor of his work.

== Early life ==
He was born in Elmer, New Jersey to Samuel Preston Foster, Editor of the Elmer Times and Fannie Bateman a housewife with a green thumb and artistic leanings. He grew up exploring the woods around his New Jersey home under the guidance of his mother. With her inspiration, Mulford grew up making his own small gardens with the wild plants that he had gathered. He eventually started collecting snakes, lizards and other reptiles whenever he could. He attended school and graduated in 1905 as salutatorian from Elmer High School spending his free time out of doors.

== Professional career ==
=== Banker/Editor ===
Mulford's father encouraged him to become educated in business, being concerned that his love of nature would not be profitable. To satisfy this urging, he attended and graduated from a Philadelphia business school. He worked for 5 years in the top 2 Philadelphia banks during this training and in the year following graduation. In 1910 he decided to leave Philadelphia and took a job with his father's newspaper as Associate Editor back in Elmer, NJ. but within a year, he was back in Philadelphia.

=== Naturalist/Lecturer ===
Mulford demonstrating safety of snakes during one of many public lectures.

After his 1911 marriage he and his wife purchased land north of Harrisburg, Pennsylvania at Cold Springs. It was a large tract of land. Mulford and Fridel lived in a multi-story home with the basement and an outbuilding devoted to his snakes. It was remote, connected to services only by a train with a depot near their house and walking path. He had plans of refurbishing one of the old farmhouses on the property although this never transpired. According to historians the farmhouse likely burned down sometime in 1919 and the family left Cold Springs sometime after this. During his years at Cold Springs Mulford kept busy on the property developing the former hotel grounds, growing an orchard, raising fruits and vegetables, his reptiles and squab as well as involved in some fashion with the bottling and selling of the spring water which came from underground sources. In Mulford's time, the collected spring water and squab would eventually find their way to tables as far away as Harrisburg and Philadelphia. Additional information has been collected on the Cold Springs inhabitants of the early 1900s including the Fosters and can be found in the book Cold Spring Hotel Site.

Mulford also worked elsewhere for extra money. He worked as a camp Naturalist and instructor for Camp Kenebec in Maine where he would go in mid-summer. In the winter he lectured to schools, colleges and Boy Scout groups as well as the YMCA. He was already renowned as both a Naturalist and lecturer. The New Jersey State Board of Agriculture had realized the value of his work and arranged to send him on a lecture tour around the state to discuss the value of snakes, lizards and turtles at the Farmer's Institutes held at the various counties during the winter shortly after his marriage. He was known to many as the "Snake Man" having specialized in the reptiles and for that matter all forms of nature for many years. He was a charismatic speaker and always pleased his audiences with his enthusiasm and accentuation of humorous and interesting facts. Newspaper articles stated that he had in his possession the largest private collection of living reptiles in the state.

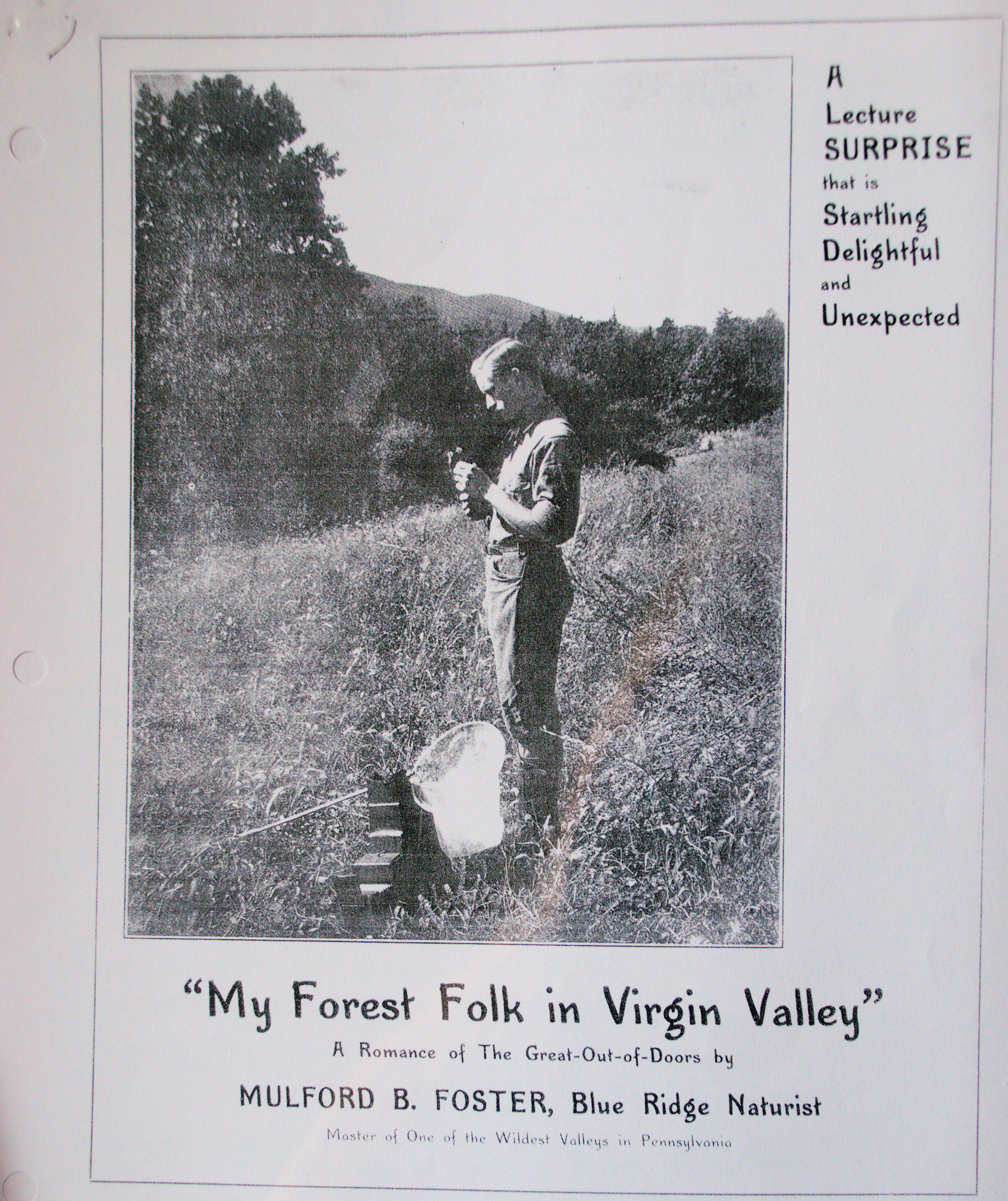
Mulford's brochure advertising his nature lectures.

Between the years of 1908-1918 he enjoyed the great influence of Elbert Hubbard. Hubbard, a writer and publisher of east Aurora, N.Y. had established a philosophical society which coincided with the developing philosophy held by Mulford. He was invited to lecture in New York on the top of snakes. The presentation earned him much favorable publicity because he had live snakes on stage with him. During the presentation they coiled around his neck, found refuge in his pockets or slid inside his shirt against his warm body. His motive was to teach the audience understanding and acceptance toward snakes. He lectured in many eastern cities and Mulford received publicity from Elbert in several ways, even having him write the chapter called "Just Snakes" in one of his books called So Here Then Cometh Pig-pen Pete; Or, Some Chums of Mine.

While living in Cold Springs he maintained a friendship with another writer Conrad Richter. Conrad and his wife lived in Pine Grove, Pennsylvania, which was a nearby town. Letters between the two as well as pictures in possession of the family reflect a close camaraderie. Conrad once wrote "If anyone has a unique paradise of his own on earth, that one is Mulford Foster, Master of one of the prettiest and wildest valleys in Pennsylvania, he has on his immense primeval estate a limpid lake where wood creatures come down to drink, a magic winding little river for his silent canoe, a collection of almost every variety of domestic animal and bird, pet skunks, several dozen kinds of tamed snakes, wild flowers, trees and shrubs and a million wild creatures that have flocked to his place from the mountains about because they know that no harm can come to them here, and Foster attired in brown flannel and stealing noiselessly through the woods with the light foot and deftness of a Mohican, is all day long and often at evening out among them.".

In 1918 an opportunity presented itself that intrigued him with a training course offered by the Davy Tree Expert company in Kent, Ohio. Since he already had an affinity with trees it was a simple step to learn how to sell tree service to the people who had large estates in the area of Baltimore, Washington and Virginia. He remained the Davy company representative of these three states during the years 1918–1923.

=== Landscape Architect ===
While working for the Davy Tree Company he began entertaining the idea of changing professions and with his prior passion for growing and designing gardens in his youth, he liked the prospect of becoming a landscape architect. He bought as many books on the subject and began teaching himself the art. In 1923 he moved his family to Florida and began establishing himself as a well-respected landscaper, first in Palm Beach where he was in charge of landscape design with Exotic Gardens, then moving to Orlando, Florida. Many Orlando businesses and estates have Mulford's artistic mark on them still present to this day. A few of the important landscape projects done between 1925 and 1958 include Lancaster Park, a subdivision in Orlando, FL (1925); the ranch house grounds for Horseshoe Ranch, a 10,000-acre (40 km^{2}) ranch on the Kissimmee River, Florida (1925); the Episcopal Cathedral Church of St Luke downtown Orlando (1925) where he provided the original landscape design (with his son Bert revamping the historic church in 1987); Poinsettia Park in Winter Haven, FL (1926); Ivanhoe Shores, subdivision in Orlando, Fl (1926); Azalea Park, Orlando, FL (1935); The Herlong Estate in Leesburg, FL (1938); The Orlando Garden Club, Orlando, FL (1958); the Floating Islands at Leesburg, FL (1953–1958) during which Foster moved a six trunk date palm from 718 Magnolia to Leesburg. He won a design award for this project in 1953. Photographs and news clippings of his accomplishments are among the records at UCF; a large interior tropical garden at the American Mutual Liability Insurance Company, Wakefield, Massachusetts (1957) as well as designed and supervised planting of the grounds of the Clarkstown Country Club, Nyack, NY (1932–1934) and Marine Studios at Marineland, Florida (1937–1938) where he supervised the planting and rock gardens as well as working directly with the building and architects, as well as the engineer. Records relating to this project including photographs of the actual landscaping in progress along with the completed project and original brochure can be found among the UCF collection.

=== Artist/Photographer ===
When discussing his artistic career at age 86 he reminisced that he never intended to be an artist. His wife reported to the newspaper interviewer that "it just welled up out of him". Mulford recalled that his first paintings were done on frosted windowpanes in New Jersey. Then in his early twenties he started experimenting with photography. This led directly into his early formal painting. A Graflex camera became his constant companion on field trips exploring for snakes, the primary subject on his film of those early days. It was at this time that he inevitably he saw the wildflowers in fields and forests. He experienced the light and shadow of the open and sheltered places. He wasn't able to always capture what he saw and felt on film. He eventually found the answer in painting.

Once he lived in Florida he began taking photos of large estates including their grounds, their gardens, their specimen plants, the vistas as seen through their gates and sold them for extra income. The owners often voiced the thought that they wished they could be in color as these were the days before color film or digital cameras. To add color he used cotton twisted on a toothpick dipped in paint. In tinting he had to get acquainted with artist oils. He saw details of leaves and bark. He saw the natural arrangements of branches and trunks and this made him think about structure. Soon he had made the step from shading photographs to actual painting. His first painting was a canvas of a garden scene with a wall and large vases. It was hung in a Baltimore Show. From that painting forward he made time to paint. It was realistic work, always of plants. His early paintings in 1923 were categorized as "Photographic". From there he began painting his series labeled "Realistic" paintings from 1925 to 1928. An unknown artist friend looked at one of his early efforts and made the comment that he did not have to paint every leaf. The period of details however survived until 1928 when the paintings became more stylized under the tutelage of Leopold Stokowski. This experience came about when Stokowski, a long-time friend of Mrs. Bovington, then employing Mulford as a landscape architect for her estate, told her he was looking for someone to accompany the family to Europe. Knowing the two individuals, she immediately recommended Mulford who accepted eagerly. Stokowski took him to Switzerland, France and Italy where they spent most of the summer of 1928 in the Alps. Stokowski was eager to see Europe through Mulford's eyes. He viewed life in a different way than Stokowski had experienced before. It was Mulford's great pleasure to explain plant life from his philosophical point of view. Stokowski was the disciplinarian for Mulford. He required a painting every day from him. It was almost by the demand of Stokowski that Mulford created over forty impressions of his experience that summer, the major portions being the French Alps in and around Haute Savoir. These paintings were compiled in a book Stokowski Sees that was privately printed but not published and the book is currently held by Michael Spencer who is still deciding on its future, although many drawings and paintings are held by family members from this era and his memories are recollected in memoir accounts. After his return from Europe he continued to paint with his newfound skills and outlook.

Between the years 1928-1932 he painted a group of paintings he called "Stylized". In his Orange Grove painting he used familiar motifs in a highly stylized rendition of orange groves found everywhere at the time in Florida. The round form of the orange tree mimicked by the round oranges themselves broken up by the lines of palm fronds, fences and crates. The lake is repeating the line of the arched trunk hanging over it. The grouping of leaves each is repeating cleverly the whole form of the lake. The ornamental form of Euphorbias was a persistent stimulus which produced three important paintings. In one, Euphorbia expressed a freer flowing style with its long undulating branches waving as a Bali dancer would, leading to the creation of The Dancers. In fact the Bali mask in the painting suggests a comparison. The very young Bali girls perform their ceremonial dances by undulating motion of the arms rather than of the feet or body. Mulford tried to show that the plant does the same thing in ten years what the Bali dancer can do in ten minutes. The motion of the plant is solidified and has the duration of many years, while the dance of the little girl is observed in but a fleeting glimpse of each movement. It is a unity of life's expressions with each form finding its happiness in expressing its rhythm within the limits of its timing. Another painting, Polynesian took as its pivot the five points of a talkative Stapelia whose form symbolizes heaven and sun. The pattern of the plant was echoed in the Polynesian tapa cloth which was the inspiration for the painting and is seen in the background. The angular Padilanthus was used as well to compose symphony of harmonious form. The idea of the painting was to build a symphonic interpretation of these motifs from their original primitive representations, reappearing again in living form. The few simple motifs are found repeated in each object with a natural simplicity which the artist has caught and tried to reproduce. Between the years 1930 and 1935 Mulford's paintings took on a combination of stylized and decorative style. The "Philosophical" series was started between 1932 and 1936. In Self Defense, every living thing has its own protection. This begins with the flowering date palm and its maze of thousand spikes or thorns pointing in every direction guarding reproduction from conception to maturing of egg cells that we call seeds or fruit. After this painting was completed, Mulford made a frame to hold it but immediately the frame seemed to defeat the purpose of the expression to be illustrated. The palm was confined. This led to painting the fronds on the frame, extending them up and out of the frame. He helped develop the Nyack Country Club in New York between the years 1932–1934. He used elephants to move and plow the dirt. Being the sensitive man that he was he observed that each elephant had his own personality and it was reflected in their eyes. His elephant painting reflects this insight. In Mimicry the artist sympathetically depicts the parallel relationship between one of the lizard's mannerisms and that of the Anthurium. The little tendrils and feet of the lowest white leaved vine compared to the little feet of the lizard. The appearance is very much the same. The leaves and flower in the painting represents the family Aracae, of which the calla lily is a member. They are among the earliest and simplest forms of plants. The lizard as well is a very early and simple form of the reptiles. The painting is filled with subtle repetitions with colors suggesting a deep primeval forest with its many hidden forms. He described the motivation behind the Climbers. It had been motivated by a huge, old, gnarled vine growing outside his studio at Tropical Arts. The vine in his painting climbs up the tree trunk for light and air. A small tendril is the intelligence part of the vine. It is the guide for its motivation. Likewise the small tender tongue of the snake is the sensitive ear and nose which guide the snake to quiet resting places. The parallel means of motivation of these two forms create the similar shape of their bodies and a similar type of intelligence. The vine and snake are both elemental and early forms of life, assembled in harmonious composition in this painting. His series Impressions of Mexico was completed between 1936 and 1938.

By 1936 he was almost entirely painting on wood such a flat application of oil paint that even artists asked him if he painted in tempera. He had painted on canvas but with the painting of his plant subjects he felt closer to the earth if he worked on wood. One medium that he used and was very skilled was painting in oil on rice pith. This is very thin, like tissue paper although not paper at all but rather the pith of the rice plant cut under water by the Japanese. So deft was his use of oil on this transparent, lighter than air substance that there were often accusations that it surely could not be done with oil. The Japanese frequently used tempera on rice pith so everyone assumed he was using it as well.

While Mulford was exploring South America, he initially would paint his renditions of the plants that he and Racine had collected including the flowers and fruit found. In the beginning he used oils which meant carrying around the tubes of paint as well as having to let the pictures dry each night. In South America this had its disadvantages when the weather was wet or temperatures too cold to allow the oil paintings to dry. He subsequently went to colored pencils which eliminated the need for drying, could be done quickly and simplified the supplies he needed to carry around.

During the decades of the 1950s and 1960s while much of Mulford's time was spent exploring, collecting, writing, cultivating, and designing yards he also managed to paint. His final painting series was called Synthesis and was completed over the years 1950–1966. He continued to do sketches and smaller works but Palm Family, Orchid Family and Cactus Family were his last serious paintings. It is this last series that prompted the name "passionate plant lover". He ultimately held a showing at the Art Center of Maitland in September 1975 exhibiting all his paintings including all the series from the Photographic to the Synthesis. The Foster estate donated Mulford's last series of paintings to the Harry P. Leu Gardens where they are part of a permanent art exhibit.

=== Horticulturist/hybridizer ===
Mulford had the reputation of being the first hybridizer of the great self-heading philodendron after bringing it to the US in 1940 and as a hybridizer had extensive demands to maintain. In 1951 he received the Herbert Medal for his work and discoveries in amaryllis. In 1962 he received a citation from the American Horticultural Society Congress for contributions to the knowledge of bromeliads. He has more than forty notable crosses of bromeliads and amaryllids. The principal bromeliads that were hybridized were confined to the billbergia and vrieseas subfamilies. One popular hybrid was the Billbergia 'Muriel Waterman' (Billbergia horrida var. tigrina which he crossed in 1946 and it first flowered in 1950. He had significant influence in the world of bromeliad growers and popularized the use of the term "pups" for naming the offshoots of bromeliads. He ran the Tropical Arts Nursery in Orlando, Florida located at 718 N. Magnolia on the corner of Magnolia and Colonial Drive along with the Latch String tea room and his art studio between the years 1924-1957. The business of growing and cultivating his plants took hours of his time. In 1953 he and his wife, Racine purchased 12 acres (49,000 m^{2}) of property north of town and named it "Bromel-La" and 6 years later their house was built and they moved on to the land. He had two greenhouses built each 30 X 60 feet (18 m). The property would be a showcase and sanctuary of plants that had been both collected as well as his hybrid bromeliads during the 20 years that he and Racine owned the land. It had been hoped that after his death the property would remain a safe haven for bromeliads but the monies for this purpose were never raised and it was sold to private sources.

=== Explorer and Collector ===
First page of Brazil, Orchids of the Tropics

Mulford began traveling to Mexico in 1935 taking his first trip with Tibor Pataky, an artist friend. This trip was written about in his book Adventures in Mexico. He returned with Racine, his second wife in 1936 and began making frequent trips to South America over the next twenty years. Mulford had a great interest in finding both new and old species of plants that could be used as both indoor decorations and landscape material. In 1938 Mulford made a Cuban expedition and from this trip he introduced Agave caribbea to Florida. Around this same time Mulford met Lyman Smith who was working at Harvard's Gray Herbarium, being referred to him by sources in the Smithsonian. Lyman ultimately would be of help with the identification and classification of the bromeliads that Mulford would be collecting. It is Lyman Smith who directed him to Brazil as he had himself been there and collected specimens. Mulford had initially expressed an interest in exploring Dutch Guiana Mulford's and Racine's book Brazil, Orchid of the Tropics, a long out of print book but available through used sources was a well told story of their 1940 trip to Brazil. The book was a success and its completion brought the artful teamwork that was to mark the relationship between Racine and Mulford. His keen vision, liveliness and resourcefulness balanced with her devotion and help in caring for all of the plants and helping organize his materials, keep fastidious notes of her own were replicated many times over the years with many projects. In 1939 Mulford set off to Brazil again for six months covering much better known areas than their previous trip. Mulford was again able to find new species in places that were supposedly already previously explored and declared exhausted by prior collectors over the previous one hundred and fifty years. Mulford recollected a number of "lost" species during his trips to Brazil. He introduced the brilliant yellow flowering tree, Tabebuia umbellate to North America. This tree is now famous in Orlando, Florida. In 1940 he made his second six month expedition to Brazil and Trinidad this time specializing on bromeliads, orchids and philodendrons. From this trip he introduced many new bromeliads and the now famous self-heading philodendrons. World War II put a stop to further expeditions for some years. Mulford turned his attention to cultivating and popularizing the bromeliads. He continued to work with Lyman Smith who continued to describe and identify the bromeliads that had been brought back from Brazil in the preceding years. In 1946 Mulford resumed his expeditions. From Brazil he brought back Begonia acetosa and introduced it to US gardeners. He and Racine also traveled to Columbia. This trip followed the earlier trail of the famous Édouard André to confirm and add to his discoveries 75 years before. These were considered one of the most important bromeliad areas of Latin America. In 1948 he made a plant expedition around South America collecting in Dutch Guiana, Brazil, Bolivia, Peru, Ecuador, Colombia Costa Rica, Cuba, Puerto Rico and Trinidad. Several years later in 1951 he would leave on a Venezuelan plant expedition. This was followed in 1954 to Jamaica with his final plant collecting trip made to Mexico in 1957. During these trips Mulford not only collected thousands of herbarium specimens for the Gray Herbarium of Harvard University and the Smithsonian Institution of Washington, DC where all of the scientific data is now on file but he also collected thousands of seeds and live plants to enrich the variety for Florida gardens.

The following is a list of the various South American locations that Mulford was known to have traveled for plants outside the U.S., frequently with his wife Racine at his side. The process of collecting and preserving the specimens was rigorous and well documented in existing records.

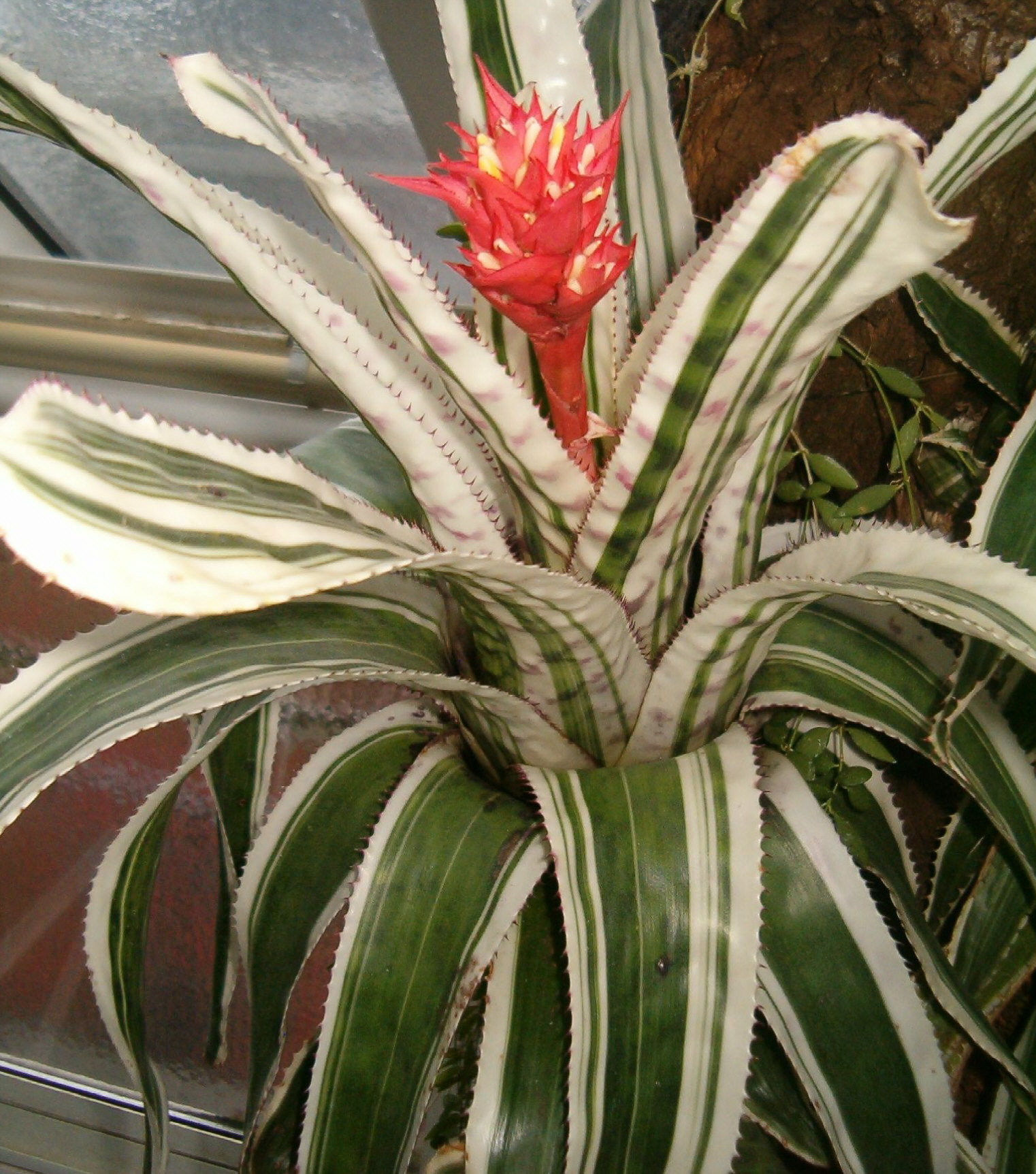
Aechmea orlandiana is one of the new species discovered by Mulford in Brazil and named after his home town of Orlando, Florida.

- Brazil
- Peru
- Bolivia
- Ecuador
- Panama
- Costa Rica
- Mexico
- Puerto Rico
- Colombia
- Dutch Guiana
- Cuba
- Jamaica
- Venezuela
- Trinidad

=== New Species of Plants Collected ===
The following species of plants are taken from the Foster's book Brazil, Orchid of the Tropics, the Gray's Herbarium at Harvard University and the Smithsonian Institution's Department of Botany. As the number of new species found and collected from South America by Mulford is estimated to be between 170 and perhaps over 200 this list is currently incomplete. Other names can be found in the Institute of Botany in Brazil although few new species are in that location. In the United States the plants were identified predominantly by Lyman Smith after Mulford and at times Mulford and his wife Racine had collected the specimens and returned with them to the US. Sometimes it was discovered in retrospect that he had indeed discovered a new species.

Bromeliaceae

- Achmea ramosa var. festiva
- Aechmea servitensis var. exigua
- Aechmea conifera
- Aechmea orlandiana
- Aechmea zebrina
- Aechmea victoriana
- Aechmea triangularis
- Aechmea pineliana var. minuta
- Aechmea podantha
- Aechmea perforata
- Aechmea nervata
- Aechmea mutica
- Aechmea mulfordii
- Aechmea maculate
- Aechmea macrochlamys
- Aechmea leucolepis
- Aechmea lateralis
- Aechmea lasseri
- Aechmea distichantha var. canaliculata
- Aechmea chlorophylla
- Aechmea coelestis var. albo-marginatus
- Aechmea caudata var. variegata
- Aechmea castanea
- Aechmea capixabae
- Aechmea araneosa
- Billbergia iridifolia var. concolor
- Billbergia chlorantha
- Billbergia euphemiae var. saundersioides
- Billbergia fosteriana
- Billbergia leptopoda
- Billbergia minarum
- Billbergia amoena var. penduliflora
- Bromelia alta
- Bromelia fosteriana
- Bromelia fragilis
- Canistrum fosterianum
- Cryptanthopsis navioides
- Cryptanthus bromelioides var. tricolor
- Cryptanthus fosterianus
- Cryptanthus maritimus
- Cryptanthus bahianus
- Cryptanthus incrassatus
- Dyckia fosteriana
- Dyckia lutziana
- Dyckia pseudococcinea
- Dyckia simulans
- Dyckia ursine
- Encholirium paraibae
- Encholirium hoehneanum
- Encholirium horridum
- Gravisia rubens
- Gravisia fosteriana
- Greigia collina
- Greigia mulfordii
- Greigia nubigena
- Greigia racinae
- Greigia sanctae-martae
- Guzmania acuminata
- Guzmania amplectens
- Guzmania angustifolia var. nivea
- Guzmania fosteriana
- Guzmania geniculata
- Guzmania globosa
- Guzmania hedychioides
- Guzmania lychnis
- Guzmania nubigena
- Guzmania pungens
- Guzmania radiata
- Guzmania stricta
- Hechtia caudata
- Hechtia fosteriana
- Hechtia integerrima
- Hohenbergia catingae var. elongata
- Hohenbergia minor
- Hohenbergia disjuncta
- Hohenbergia littoralis
- Karawata depressa, syn. Aechmea depressa
- Karawata saxicola, syn. Aechmea saxicola
- Mezobromelia hospitalis, syn. Tillandsia hospitalis
- Neoregelia bahiana var. viridis
- Neoregelia carolinae var. tricolor
- Neoregelia fluminensis
- Neoregelia fosteriana
- Neoregelia leprosa
- Neoregelia macrosepala
- Neoregelia melanodonta
- Neoregelia oligantha
- Neoregelia pauciflora
- Neoregelia zonata
- Nidularium apiculatum
- Nidularium apiculatum var. serrulatum
- Nidularium itatiaiae
- Orthophytum disjunctum
- Orthophytum fosterianum
- Orthophytum maracasense
- Orthophytum foliosum
- Orthophytum rubrum
- Pitcairnia adscendens
- Pitcairnia arenicola
- Pitcairnia bella var. densior
- Pitcairnia brunnescens
- Pitcairnia calophylla
- Pitcairnia capitata
- Pitcairnia costata
- Pitcairnia deciduas
- Pitcairnia echinata var. sublaevis
- Pitcairnia elongata
- Pitcairnia flammea var. pallida
- Pitcairnia fosteriana
- Pitcairnia guzmanioides
- Pitcairnia halophila
- Pitcairnia lepidopetalon
- Pitcairnia lignosa
- Pitcairnia maritima
- Pitcairnia petraea
- Pitcairnia quesnelioides
- Pitcairnia squarrosa
- Pitcairnia tumulicola
- Pitcairnia volubilis
- Portea filifera
- Portea fosteriana
- Portea petropolitana var. extensa
- Puya sanctae-martae
- Puya atra
- Puya ultima
- Puya fosteriana
- Puya riparia
- Puya sanctae-martae
- Quesnelia imbricate
- Rokautskyia pseudoscaposa, syn. Cryptanthus pseudoscaposus
- Tillandsia acuminate
- Tillandsia arcuans
- Tillandsia arguta
- Tillandsia brevior
- Tillandsia buseri var. nubicola
- Tillandsia cernua
- Tillandsia demissa
- Tillandsia chartacea
- Tillandsia fasciculata f. alba
- Tillandsia fasciculata var. floridana
- Tillandsia fosteri
- Tillandsia fusiformis
- Tillandsia gracillima
- Tillandsia ionantha var. van-hyningii, with Van Hyning
- Tillandsia pueblensis var. glabrior, with Van Hyning
- Tillandsia racinae
- Tillandsia socialis, with Van Hyning
- Tillandsia sigmoidea
- Tillandsia steiropoda
- Tillandsia ultima
- Vriesea funebris
- Vriesea hodgei
- Vriesea languid
- Vriesea minarum
- Vriesea monacorum
- Vriesea paludosa
- Vriesea parviflora
- Vriesea platynema var. gracilior
- Vriesea procera var. rubra
- Vriesea racinae
- Vriesea rhodostachys
- Vriesea ruschii
- Vriesea stricta
- Vriesea verrucosa
- Vriesea petropolitana
- Vriesea philippo-coburgii var. vagans
- Vriesea penduliflora
- Vriesea extensa
- Vriesea hamata
- Vriesea delicatula
- Vriesea ruschi
- Vriesea vulpinoidea
- Vriesea hieroglyphica
- Vriesea fosteriana
- Vriesea haematina
- Vriesea longicaulis
- Vriesea interrogatoria
- Vriesea bicolor
- Vriesea confusa
- Vriesea cylindrica
- Vriesea egregia
- Vriesea nutans
- Wittmackia bicolor, syn. Aechmea bicolor

Amaryllidaceae

- Zephyranthes fosteri

=== Writer and Lecturer ===
Mulford was a prolific story teller in addition to his other talents. He lectured on garden and natural history subjects to colleges, universities, schools and garden clubs throughout the United States as well as in Venezuela, Costa Rica and Canada. He wrote quite a bit as well. His earliest writings came in the form of letters which were abundant even at an early age. Some were simple postcards, acknowledgments of his thoughts and yet now providing glimpses into his inner self and a road map to his outward activities. His letters were often either quite humorous or poetic prose although he also wrote poetry which he would use occasionally to adorn Christmas cards and the like. In the later years, after his move to Florida it was typical that you could find them scribbled on his Tropical Arts letterhead paper. Beginning in the 1940s Mulford along with Racine began publishing their ever-expanding bromeliad knowledge in a wide variety of garden and horticultural publications. These ranged from well-known venues such as The Smithsonian, The New York Times, and House Beautiful to trade journals such as the National Horticultural Magazine and Cactus and Succulent Journal to name just a few. A special article called "Puya, the Pineapple's Andean Ancestor" was published in the October 1950 National Geographic Magazine along with color photos. It was also during this time that they began writing their collaborative books based on travels to South America including Brazil, Orchid of the Tropics, Bromeliads-A Cultural Handbook and Air Gardens of Brazil Mulford also became the founder and President of the Bromeliad Society in 1950 through 1959 and became its editor from 1951 through 1958 and with his editorship of the Bulletin his audience became worldwide. He wrote numerous pieces for the Bromeliad Journal International which can be found in their archives with an examples frequently seen in reprints even today. He maintained this responsibility for over a decade with Racine acting a copy editor for years. Both were heavily committed to this publication at the beginning, often using their own monies to help publish the journal in the early years.

=== List of published works ===
The following publications by Mulford B Foster are discussed in this article. A more complete list of his publications may be found at

- Foster, Mulford B. (1944). "Air Plants for Home Horticulture". Home Gardening for the South. Vol. Jan.
- Foster, Mulford B. (1944). "Lazy Gardener's Dream-Come-True". Home Gardening for the South. Vol. Feb.
- Foster, Mulford B. and Racine (1943). "Exploring Brazil's Jungle Gardens". Home Gardening for the South. Vol. Aug.
- Foster, Mulford B. (1944). "Exploring for Tropical Plants". The Bulletin of Garden Club of America. Vol. July.
- Foster, Mulford B. (1943). "One Step Ahead of Mother Nature". National Horticultural Magazine. Vol. Oct.
- Foster, Mulford B. (1945). "Lateral Inflorescences in the Bromeliaceae". National Horticultural Magazine. Vol. Jan.
- Foster, Mulford B. (1945). "Blueprint of the Jungle". Journal of New York Botanical Garden. Vol. Jan.
- Foster, Mulford B. (1942). "Bromeliads of Brazil". Smithsonian Annual Report. Vol. 3723.
- Foster, Mulford B. (1945). "Introducing Bromeliads". Southern Home and Garden. Vol. May.
- Foster, Mulford B. (1945). "Do You Know the Bromeliads". New York Times. p. Garden Page.
- Foster, Mulford B. and Racine (1943). "Air Minded Plants Take a Bow". The Gardener's Chronicle. Vol. Aug.
- Foster, Mulford B. and Racine (1943). "Christmas Mexicana". The Gardener's Chronicle. Vol. Dec.
- Foster, Mulford B. and Racine (1943). "The Garden of a Thousand Orchids". The Gardener's Chronicle. Vol. Dec.
- Foster, Mulford B. (1950). "Puya, The Pineapple's Andean Ancestor". The National Geographic Magazine. Vol. 245, no. 4. pp. 463–472.
- Foster, Mulford B. and Racine (1945). Air Gardens of Brazil. Lancaster, PA: Jaques Cattell Press.
- Foster, Mulford B. and Racine (1945). Plant Life: Plant drawings from Columbia, Ecuador and Brazil. Lancaster, PA: The American Plant Life Society.
- Foster, Mulford B. (1974). Bromeliads. A Cultural Handbook. Los Angeles, USA: Bromeliad Society, Inc.
- Foster, Mulford B. and Racine (1945). Brazil, Orchids of the Tropics (print (hardcover)) (first ed.). Lancaster, PA: Jacques Cattell. pp. 314 (first edition). OCLC 183695.

== Personal life ==
Mulford was married twice. His first wife was Fridel Tautenhahn whom he married Nov 1911 in Philadelphia. It was felt by some that his intense relationship with her father led to this marriage. They had 4 children, Gerda (1912), Bert (1919), Miriam (1920) and then twins with only one daughter Jeanne Eunice surviving (in 1922). They divorced in 1933 in Florida although the children remained nearby with their mother. He married Racine Sarasy in 1935 becoming Racine Foster for whom the bromeliad genus Racinaea was named after. There were no children from this marriage. He had numerous grandchildren and great-grandchildren as well as a large extended family around him throughout the latter part of his life.

In 1974 Mulford experienced a devastating cerebrovascular accident leaving him paralyzed on one side and almost always using a wheelchair. Despite the paralysis, he continued to sketch with his good hand. He had a series of smaller strokes over the next four years before ultimately dying at his home in 1978. Following his death a memorial fund was established at the Marie Selby Botanical Gardens. The Mulford B. Foster Identification Center was established which remains to this day with the intent on furthering interest and study of the bromeliad.
