= Strobilacea =

Strobilacea may refer to:

- Acanthostachys strobilacea
- Aechmea strobilacea
- Amanoa strobilacea
- Boschniakia strobilacea
- Ephedra strobilacea
- Platycarya strobilacea
