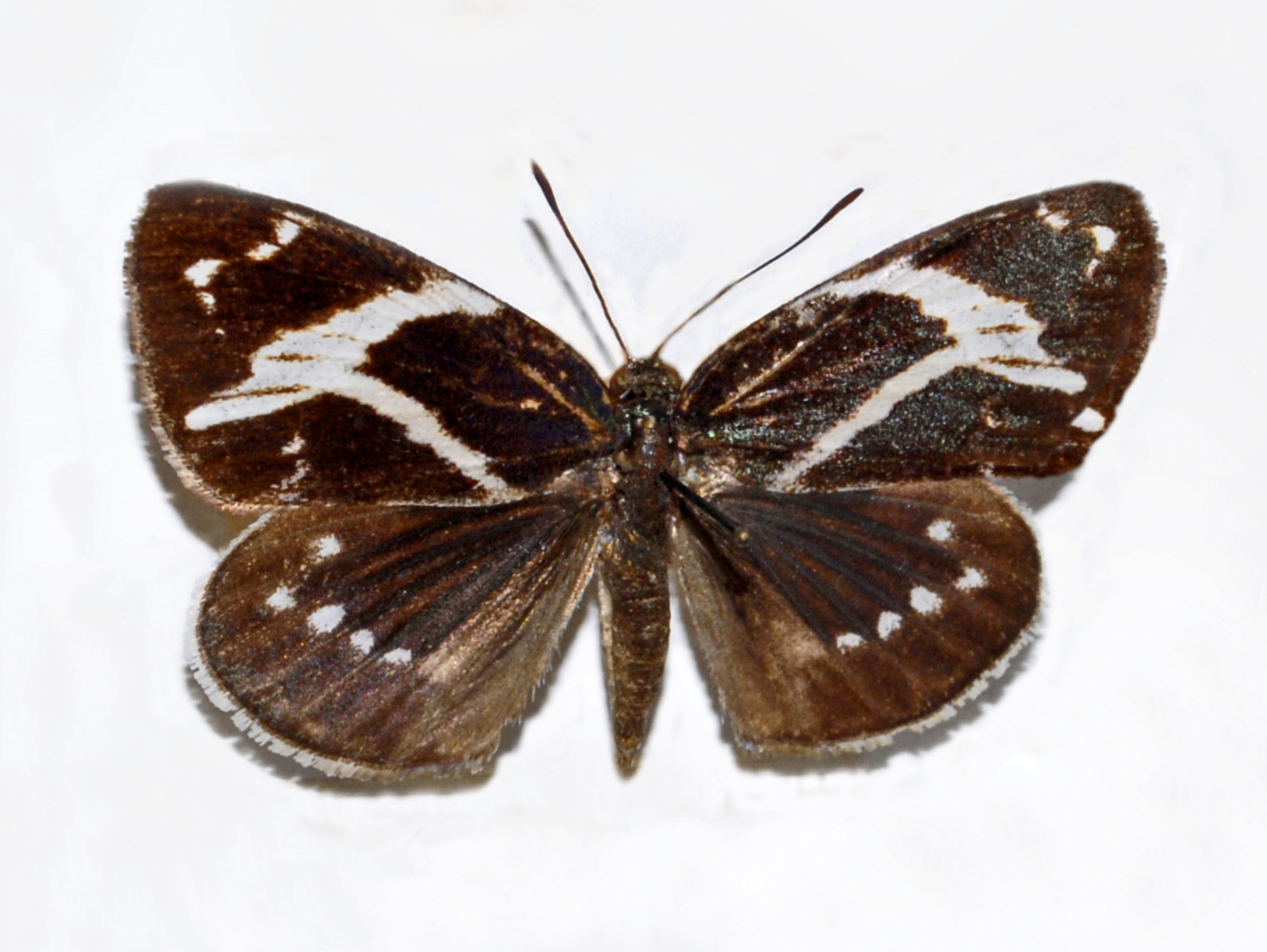
- Mounted specimen

Scientific classification
- Kingdom: Animalia
- Phylum: Arthropoda
- Class: Insecta
- Order: Lepidoptera
- Family: Castniidae
- Genus: Geyeria
- Species: G. decussata

Binomial name
- Geyeria decussata (Godart, [1824])

Synonyms
- Castnia decussata Godart, [1824]; Castnia strigata Walker, 1854; Castnia godartii Ménétriés, 1857; Castnia melaleuca Westwood, 1877 (nom. nud.); Geyeria discoidalis Buchecker, [1880]; Castnia f. fulvipyga Strand, 1913; Castnia ab. purpurascens Rothschild, 1919

= Geyeria decussata =

Species of moth

Geyeria decussata is a moth in the Castniidae family.

== Description ==
The forewings are dark brown with green iridescent scales and a disruptive pattern of white bands. In details, there are a small sinuous band near the apex and an Y marking in the middle. Also the hindwings are brown with five white spots in the border. The head, antenna and thorax are brown. Caterpillars of these moths feed on the leaf bases of bromeliads (Wittrockia superba, Vriesea philippo-coburgii and Aechmea nudicaulis).

== Distribution ==
This species can be found in Brazil.
