= A. digitata =

A. digitata may refer to:

- Adansonia digitata, the baobab, a tree species found in the hot, dry savannahs of sub-Saharan Africa
- Aechmea digitata, a plant species endemic to Brazil
