= Acanthostachys calcicola =

Scientific classification
- Kingdom: Plantae
- Clade: Tracheophytes
- Clade: Angiosperms
- Clade: Monocots
- Clade: Commelinids
- Order: Poales
- Family: Bromeliaceae
- Genus: Acanthostachys
- Species: A. calcicola

Binomial name
- Acanthostachys calcicola Marcusso & Lombardi

Species of plant

Acanthostachys calcicola is a species of plant discovered in a limestone rock in the Brazilian state of Tocantins.

Acanthostachys calcicola was discovered while conducting field work in the limestone outcrops of central Brazil's south-eastern Tocantins region. It is most similar to A. strobilacea but differs in petal colour and length, as well as in the presence of exserted stamens and pistil. A. calcicola is classified as endangered (EN) and is on the verge of extinction, according to a conservation assessment.
