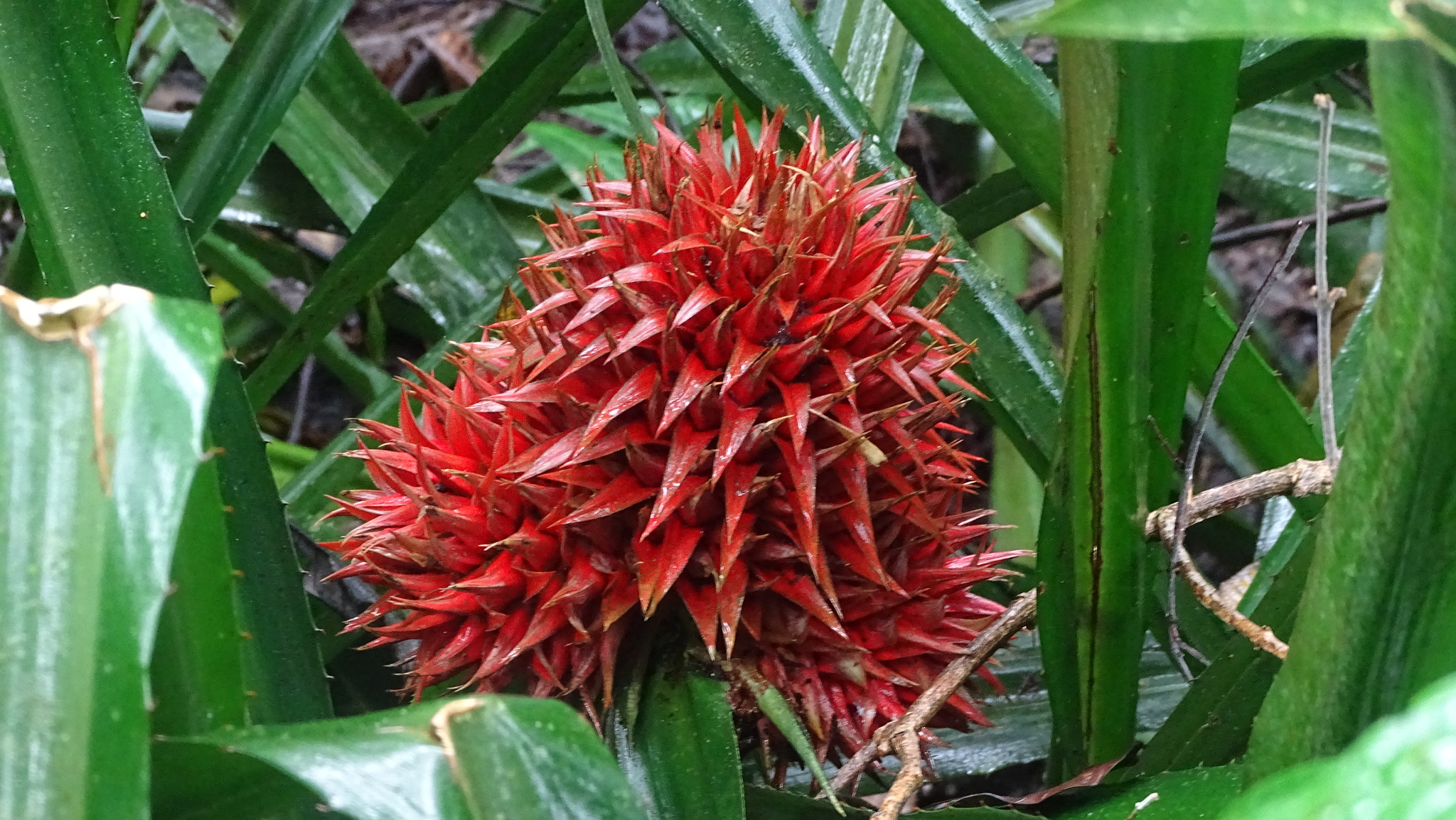
- Aechmea magdalenae observed near Gamboa in Panama

Scientific classification
- Kingdom: Plantae
- Clade: Tracheophytes
- Clade: Angiosperms
- Clade: Monocots
- Clade: Commelinids
- Order: Poales
- Family: Bromeliaceae
- Genus: Aechmea
- Subgenus: Aechmea subg. Chevaliera
- Species: A. magdalenae

Binomial name
- Aechmea magdalenae (André) André ex Baker

Synonyms
- Chevaliera magdalenae André; Bromelia magdalenae (André) C.H.Wright; Ananas magdalenae (André) Standl.; Aechmea magdalenae var. quadricolor M.B.Foster; Chevaliera magdalenae var. quadricolor (M.B.Foster) L.B.Sm. & W.J.Kress

= Aechmea magdalenae =

Species of plant

Aechmea magdalenae is a flowering plant in the Bromeliaceae family. It is also known as ixtle. This species is native to Central America, southern Mexico, Colombia and Ecuador. The specific epithet magdalenae comes from the place it was discovered, the Rio Magdalenae Valley in Colombia. The long green leaves feature fierce spines and may reach about 2.5 meters tall. In nature, it is found in moist and swampy woods. The flowers are red and give way to edible fruits.

A. magdalenae uses crassulacean acid metabolism, meaning that it takes in carbon dioxide during the night, stores it, and uses it during the day to produce carbohydrates (allowing its stomata to stay closed during the day, which limits water loss).

Aechmea magdalenae is grown in southern Mexico for its silky fibers. It is also harvested from the wild for these fibers and for its edible fruit. Many in Central and northern South America use the sap from the leaves to prevent infection in wounds, a practice that is effective because the plant has been found to contain acetic acid, which is strongly antibacterial.
