= Geyeria uruguayana =

Scientific classification
- Kingdom: Animalia
- Phylum: Arthropoda
- Clade: Pancrustacea
- Class: Insecta
- Order: Lepidoptera
- Family: Castniidae
- Genus: Geyeria
- Species: G. uruguayana

Binomial name
- Geyeria uruguayana (Burmeister, 1879)

Synonyms
- Castnia uruguayana Burmeister, 1879; Castnia f. separatula Strand, 1913; Castnia uruguayana cinerascens Houlbert, 1917; Castnia f. badariottii Raymundo, 1919; Castnia uruguayana ochreifascia Joicey & Talbot, 1925; Castnia uruguayana champaquiensis Breyer, 1929; Castnia uruguayana rubra Raymundo, 1931; Castnia uruguayana strandi Raumundo, 1931 (nomen nudum)

Species of moth

Geyeria uruguayana is a moth in the Castniidae family. It is found in Uruguay, Paraguay, Argentina and southern Brazil.

The larvae have been recorded feeding on Eryngium paniculatum.
