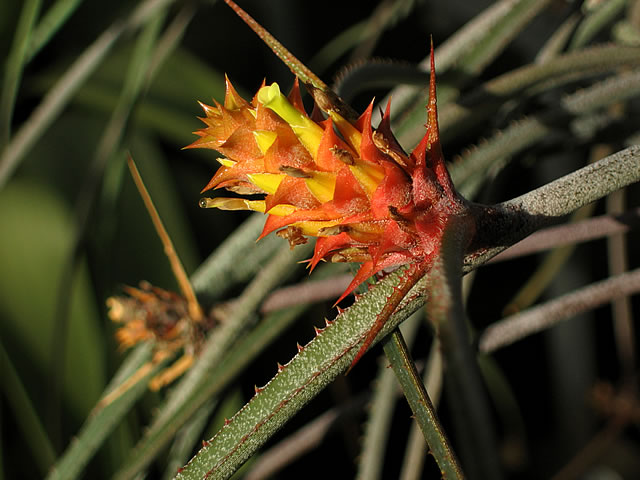
- Acanthostachys strobilacea

Scientific classification
- Kingdom: Plantae
- Clade: Tracheophytes
- Clade: Angiosperms
- Clade: Monocots
- Clade: Commelinids
- Order: Poales
- Family: Bromeliaceae
- Subfamily: Bromelioideae
- Genus: Acanthostachys; Link

= Acanthostachys =

Genus of flowering plants

Acanthostachys is a genus of the botanical family Bromeliaceae, subfamily Bromelioideae. The genus name is from the Greek “acanthos” (thorny, spiny) and “stachys” (a flower spike).

== Species ==
There are three known species, all native to South America:

- Acanthostachys pitcairnioides (Mez) Rauh & Barthlott (distribution : Northeast Brazil)
- Acanthostachys calcicola Marcusso & Lombardi (distribution : central Brazil)
- Acanthostachys strobilacea (Schultes f.) Klotzsch (distribution : Brazil, Paraguay, Argentina)
