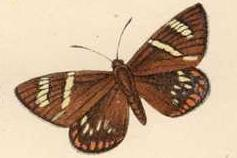
- Geyeria

Scientific classification
- Domain: Eukaryota
- Kingdom: Animalia
- Phylum: Arthropoda
- Class: Insecta
- Order: Lepidoptera
- Family: Castniidae
- Genus: Geyeria; Buchecker, [1876]

Synonyms
- Ypanema Houlbert, 1918

= Geyeria =

Genus of moths

Geyeria is a genus of moths within the family Castniidae.

== Species ==
- Geyeria decussata (Godart, [1824])
- Geyeria hubneri (Latreille, 1830)
- Geyeria uruguayana (Burmeister, 1879)
