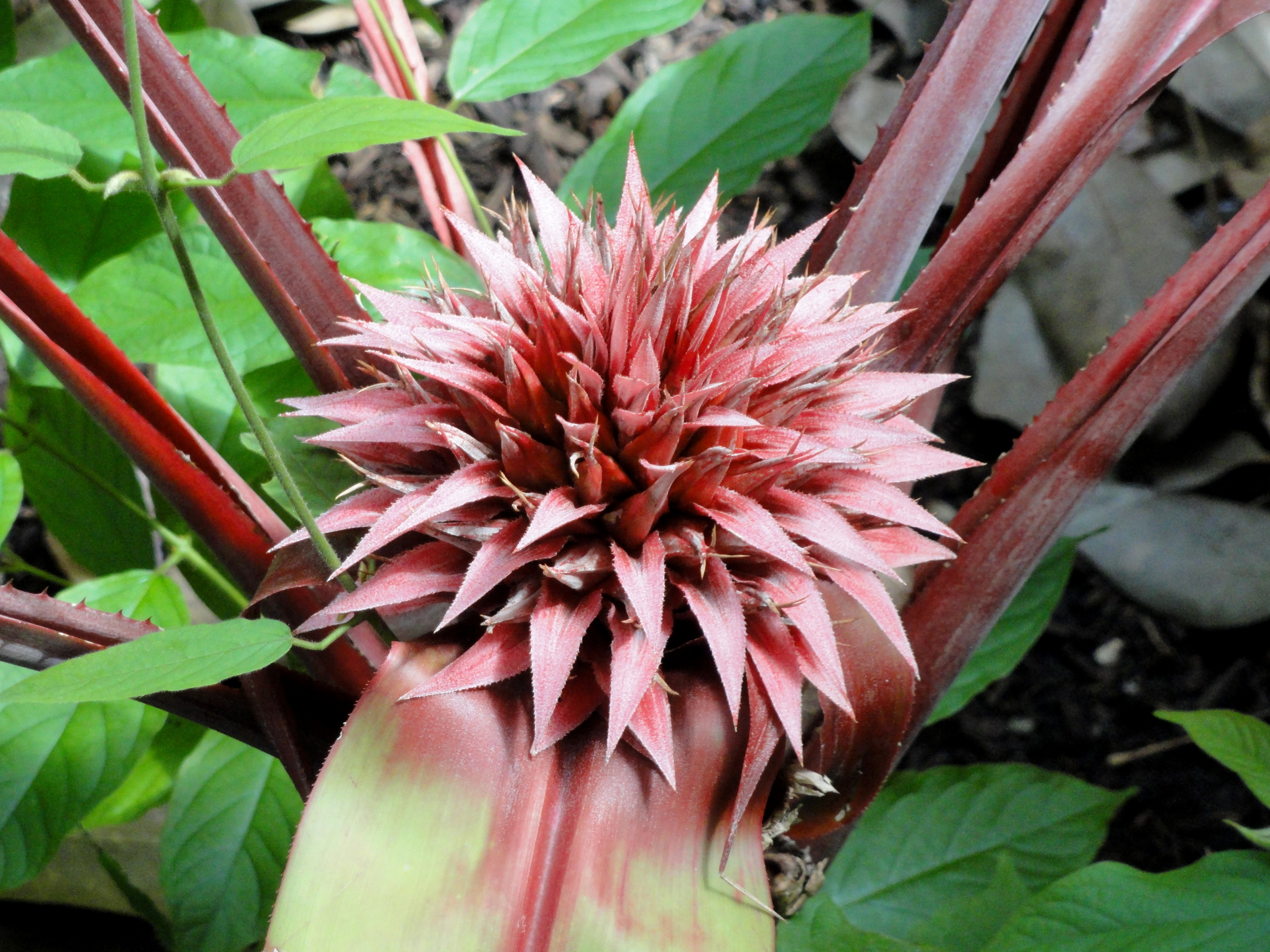
- Aechmea tayoensis at Denver Botanic Gardens

Conservation status
- Endangered (IUCN 3.1)

Scientific classification
- Kingdom: Plantae
- Clade: Tracheophytes
- Clade: Angiosperms
- Clade: Monocots
- Clade: Commelinids
- Order: Poales
- Family: Bromeliaceae
- Genus: Aechmea
- Subgenus: Aechmea subg. Chevaliera
- Species: A. tayoensis

Binomial name
- Aechmea tayoensis Gilmartin

Synonyms
- Chevaliera tayoensis (Gilmartin) L.B.Sm. & W.J.Kress

= Aechmea tayoensis =

Species of flowering plant

Aechmea tayoensis is a species of plant in the family Bromeliaceae. It is endemic to Morona-Santiago Province in Ecuador. Its natural habitat is subtropical or tropical moist lowland forests.
