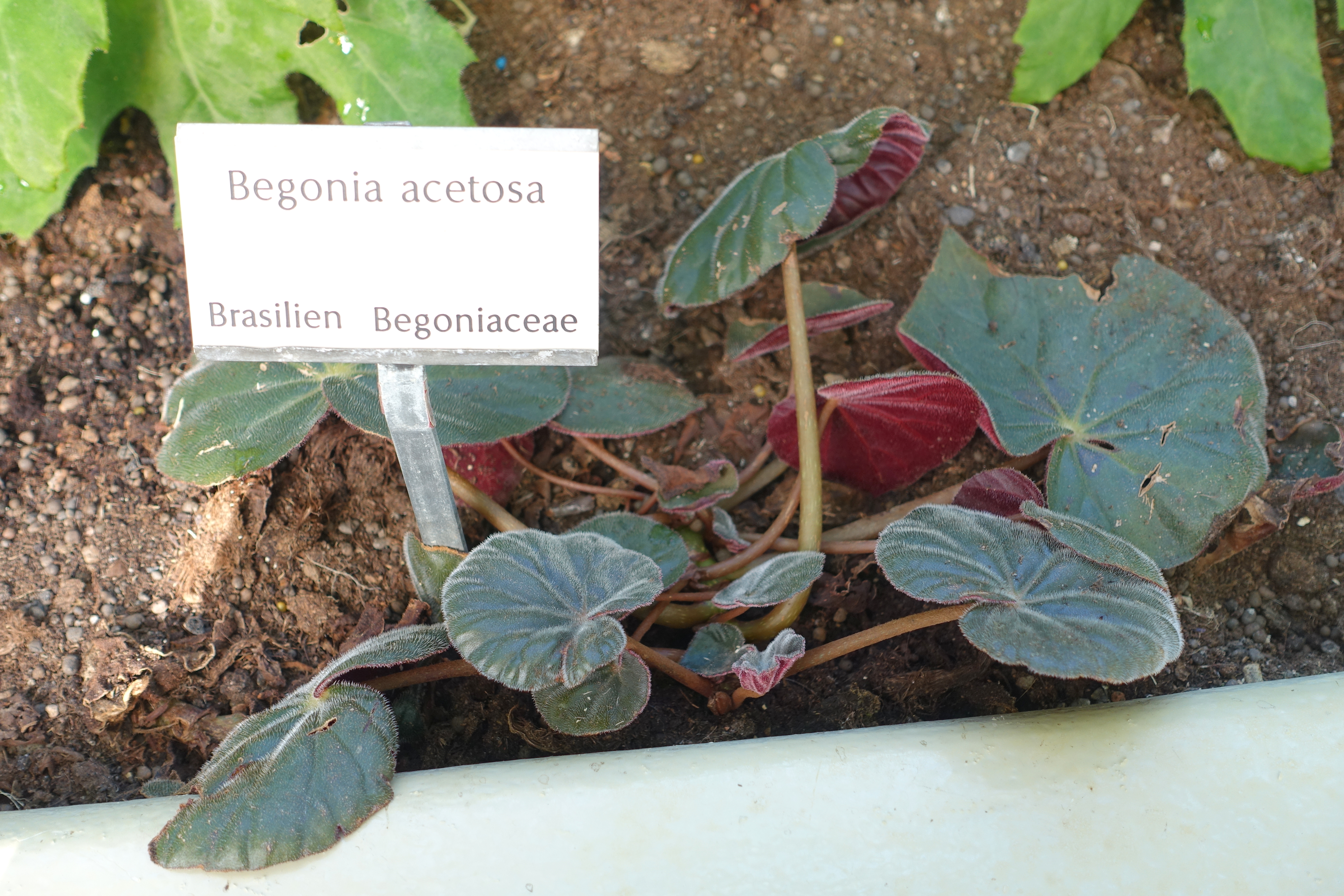
- At the Victoriaväxthuset botanical garden, Sweden
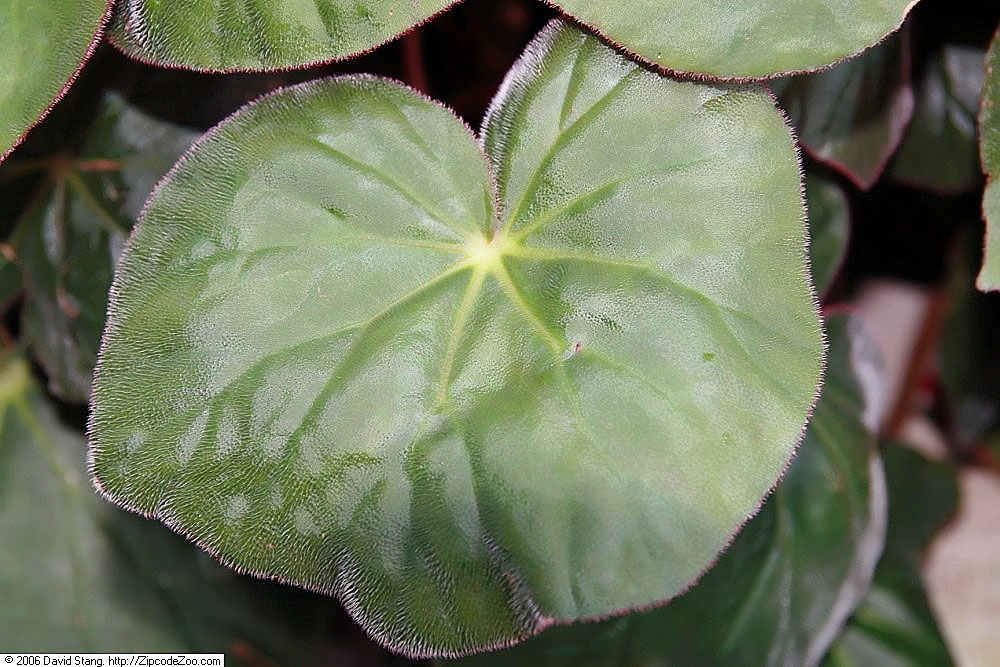
- Close-up of leaf

Scientific classification
- Kingdom: Plantae
- Clade: Embryophytes
- Clade: Tracheophytes
- Clade: Angiosperms
- Clade: Eudicots
- Clade: Rosids
- Order: Cucurbitales
- Family: Begoniaceae
- Genus: Begonia
- Species: B. acetosa

Binomial name
- Begonia acetosa Vell.

Synonyms
- Begonia cantareira hort.

= Begonia acetosa =

Species of plant

Begonia acetosa is a species of flowering plant in the family Begoniaceae, native to southeastern Brazil. It is used to create new begonia hybrids due to its attractive foliage. Begonia acetosa has been cultivated in the United States since 1946, when Mulford B. Foster introduced the species from forested mountains near Rio de Janeiro. It was first described in 1831 by José Mariano de Conceição Vellozo. The specific epithet acetosa means 'acid' or 'sour', referring to the rhubarb-like taste of its leaves.

Begonia acetosa is a herbaceous, creeping, rhizomatous begonia, growing up to 1 m (3 ft) tall. It has thick, horizontally spreading, pale green branches. Leaves are ovate to orbicular, and asymmetrical. The leaves are a dull green on the upper surface and a deep wine red on the under surface. Both the underside and upper surface of the leaf are covered with a dense layer of short white hairs. Petioles are a rusty reddish brown to a deep red, and covered in short, woolly hairs. The flowers of B. acetosa are white.

When grown in a garden, it needs up to three hours of sun to thrive, and flowers from spring to early summer.
