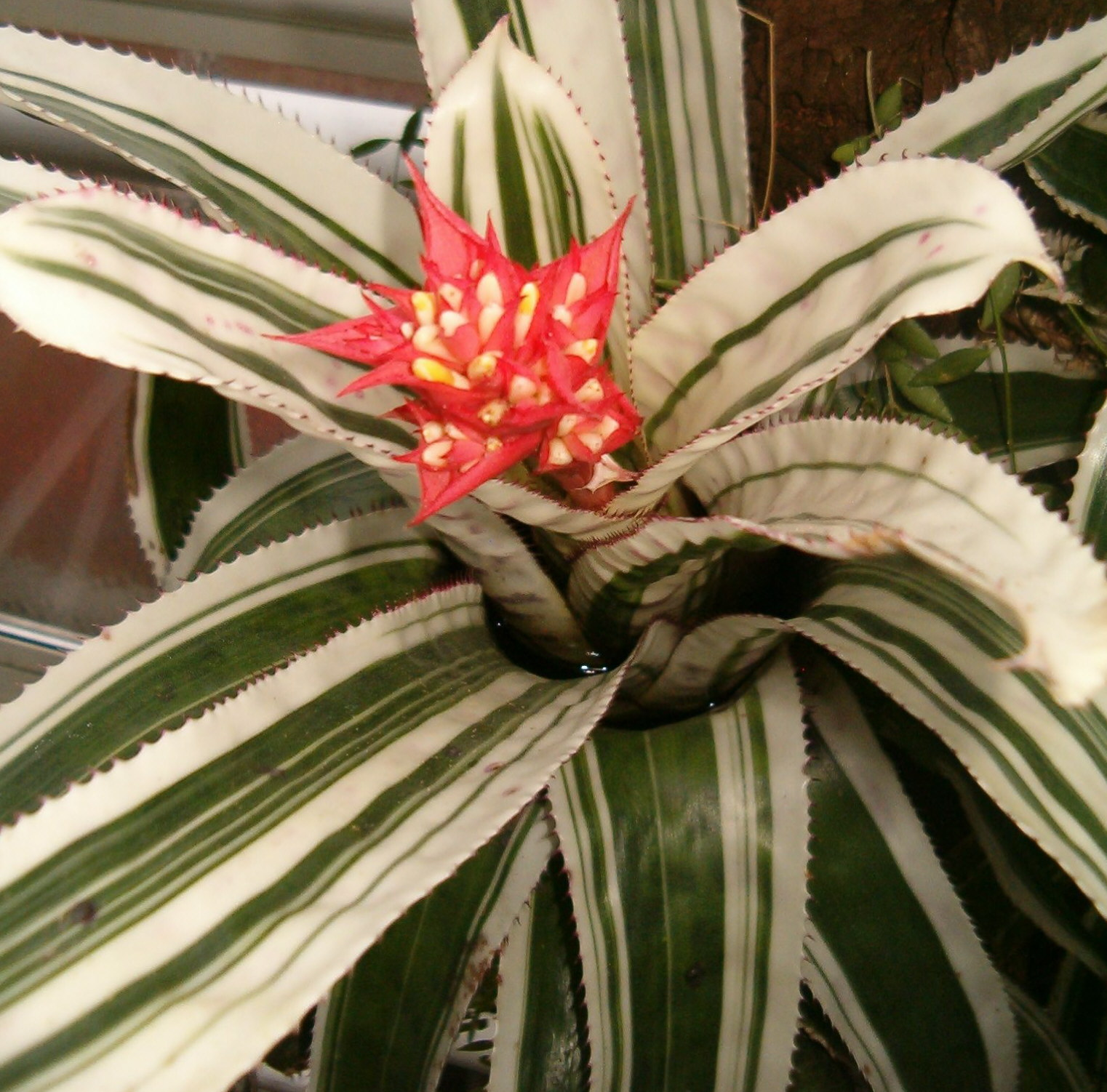
- Aechmea orlandiana

Scientific classification
- Kingdom: Plantae
- Clade: Tracheophytes
- Clade: Angiosperms
- Clade: Monocots
- Clade: Commelinids
- Order: Poales
- Family: Bromeliaceae
- Genus: Aechmea
- Subgenus: Aechmea subg. Aechmea
- Species: A. orlandiana

Binomial name
- Aechmea orlandiana L.B.Sm.

= Aechmea orlandiana =

Species of flowering plant

Aechmea orlandiana is species in the genus Aechmea endemic to Brazil. The plant was originally collected by the family of Mulford B. Foster in 1939 in Espírito Santo, Brazil, and described by in 1941 L. B. Smith. He named it for the city of Orlando, Florida, based upon it being the Foster's adopted home town, and the orange bracts and white flowers also being the city colors of Orlando.

The following subspecies are recognized:

- Aechmea orlandiana subsp. belloi E.Pereira & Leme (1986)
- Aechmea orlandiana subsp. orlandiana

== Cultivars ==
Cultivars include:

- Aechmea 'Belizia'
- Aechmea 'Bert'
- Aechmea 'Big Beauty'
- Aechmea 'Big Ben'
- Aechmea 'Bittersweet'
- Aechmea 'Black Bands'
- Aechmea 'Black Beauty'
- Aechmea 'By Golly'
- Aechmea 'Charlie'
- Aechmea 'Cloudburst'
- Aechmea 'Ensign'
- Aechmea 'First Joy'
- Aechmea 'Foster's Freckles'
- Aechmea 'Gold Tone'
- Aechmea 'Haiku'
- Aechmea 'Hayward'
- Aechmea 'Inky'
- Aechmea 'Jean Merkel'
- Aechmea 'Little Bert'
- Aechmea 'Medio Picta'
- Aechmea 'Muelleri'
- Aechmea 'Rainbow'
- Aechmea 'Tiger'
- Aechmea 'White Knight'
