= Aechmea cariocae =

Scientific classification
- Kingdom: Plantae
- Clade: Tracheophytes
- Clade: Angiosperms
- Clade: Monocots
- Clade: Commelinids
- Order: Poales
- Family: Bromeliaceae
- Genus: Aechmea
- Subgenus: Aechmea subg. Chevaliera
- Species: A. cariocae

Binomial name
- Aechmea cariocae L.B.Sm.

Synonyms
- Chevaliera cariocae (L.B.Sm.) L.B.Sm. & W.J.Kress

Species of flowering plant

Aechmea cariocae is a plant species in the genus Aechmea. This species is endemic to Tijuca National Park in Brazil.
