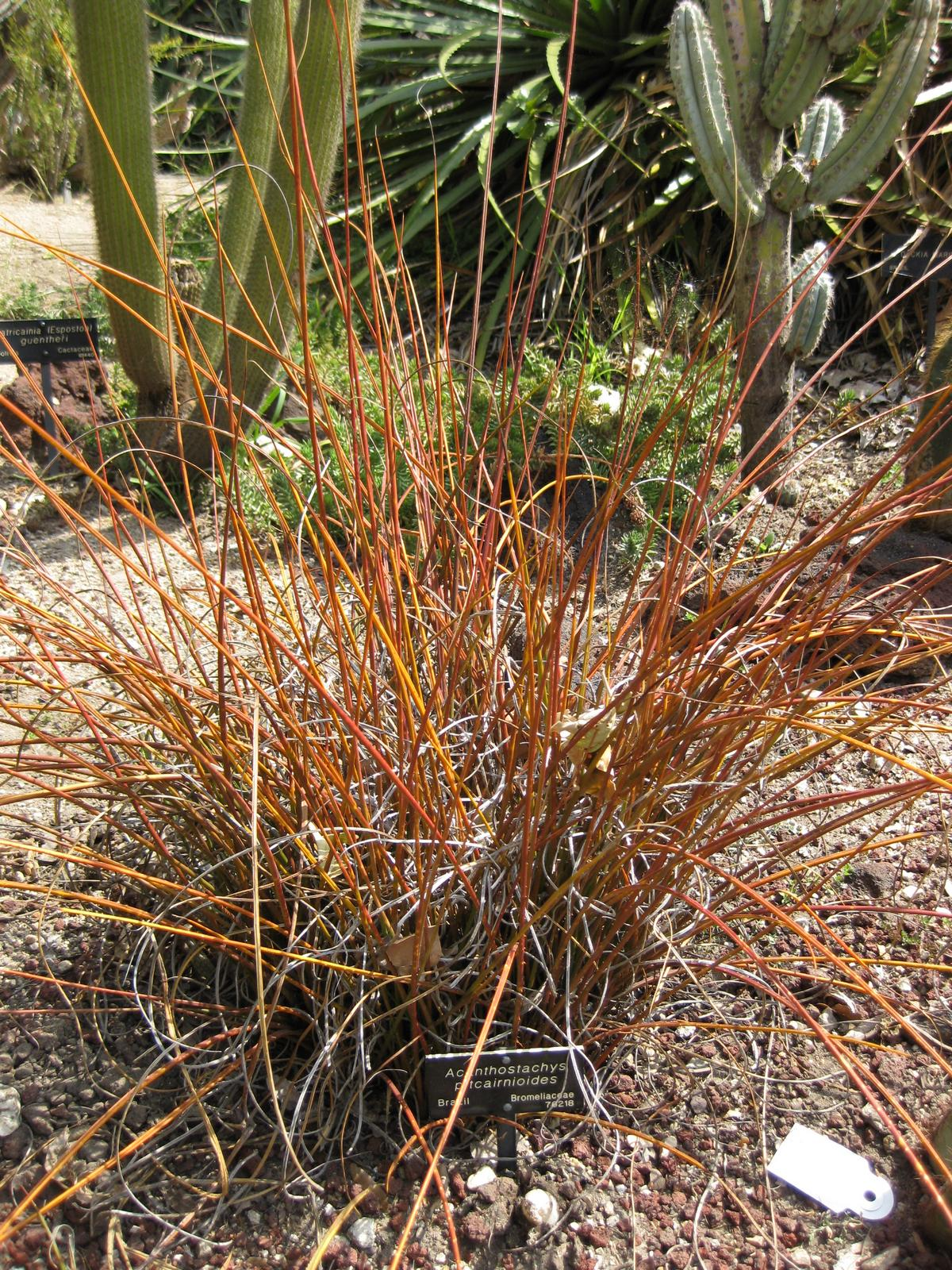

Scientific classification
- Kingdom: Plantae
- Clade: Embryophytes
- Clade: Tracheophytes
- Clade: Spermatophytes
- Clade: Angiosperms
- Clade: Monocots
- Clade: Commelinids
- Order: Poales
- Family: Bromeliaceae
- Genus: Acanthostachys
- Species: A. pitcairnioides

Binomial name
- Acanthostachys pitcairnioides (Mez) Rauh & Barthlott

Synonyms
- Aechmea pitcairnioides Mez

= Acanthostachys pitcairnioides =

Species of flowering plant

Acanthostachys pitcairnioides is a species of flowering plant in the family Bromeliaceae. It is endemic to northeast and southeast Brazil.
