= Aechmea muricata =

Scientific classification
- Kingdom: Plantae
- Clade: Tracheophytes
- Clade: Angiosperms
- Clade: Monocots
- Clade: Commelinids
- Order: Poales
- Family: Bromeliaceae
- Genus: Aechmea
- Subgenus: Aechmea subg. Chevaliera
- Species: A. muricata

Binomial name
- Aechmea muricata (Arruda) L.B.Sm.

Synonyms
- Bromelia muricata Arruda; Ananas muricatus (Arruda) Schult. & Schult.f.; Ananassa muricata (Arruda) D.Dietr.; Chevaliera muricata (Arruda) L.B.Sm. & W.J.Kress; Aechmea stephanophora E.Morren ex Baker; Chevaliera stephanophora (E.Morren ex Baker) Mez

Species of flowering plant

Aechmea muricata is a plant species in the genus Aechmea. This species is endemic to eastern Brazil, known from the States of Pernambuco and Alagoas.
