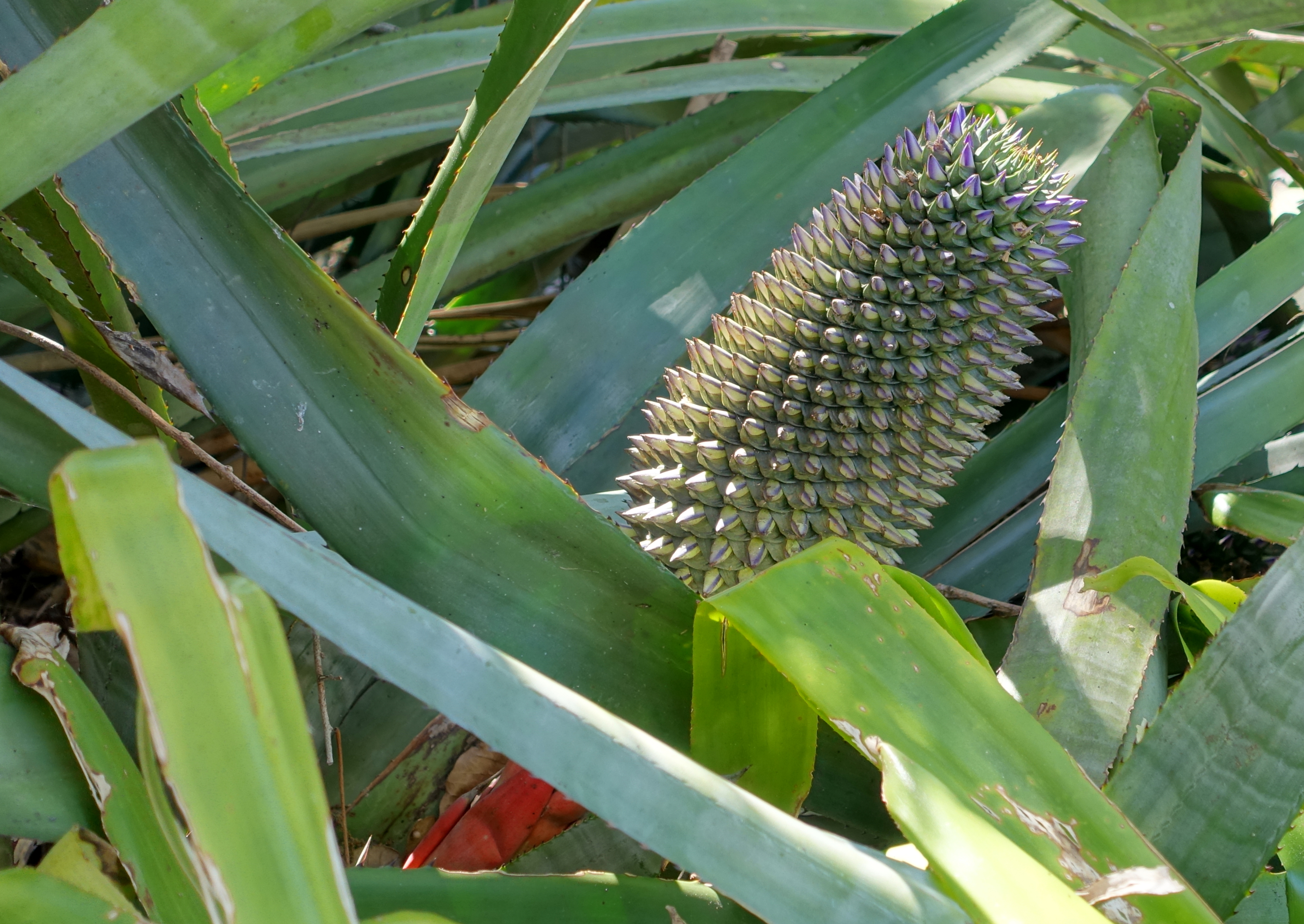

Scientific classification
- Kingdom: Plantae
- Clade: Tracheophytes
- Clade: Angiosperms
- Clade: Monocots
- Clade: Commelinids
- Order: Poales
- Family: Bromeliaceae
- Genus: Aechmea
- Subgenus: Aechmea subg. Chevaliera
- Species: A. sphaerocephala

Binomial name
- Aechmea sphaerocephala (Gaudich.) Baker

Synonyms
- Chevaliera sphaerocephala Gaudich.; Chevaliera gigantea Maury; Aechmea gigantea (Maury) Baker

= Aechmea sphaerocephala =

Species of plant

Aechmea sphaerocephala is a species of flowering plant in the Bromeliaceae family. It is endemic to southeastern Brazil, known from the States of Espírito Santo and Rio de Janeiro.
