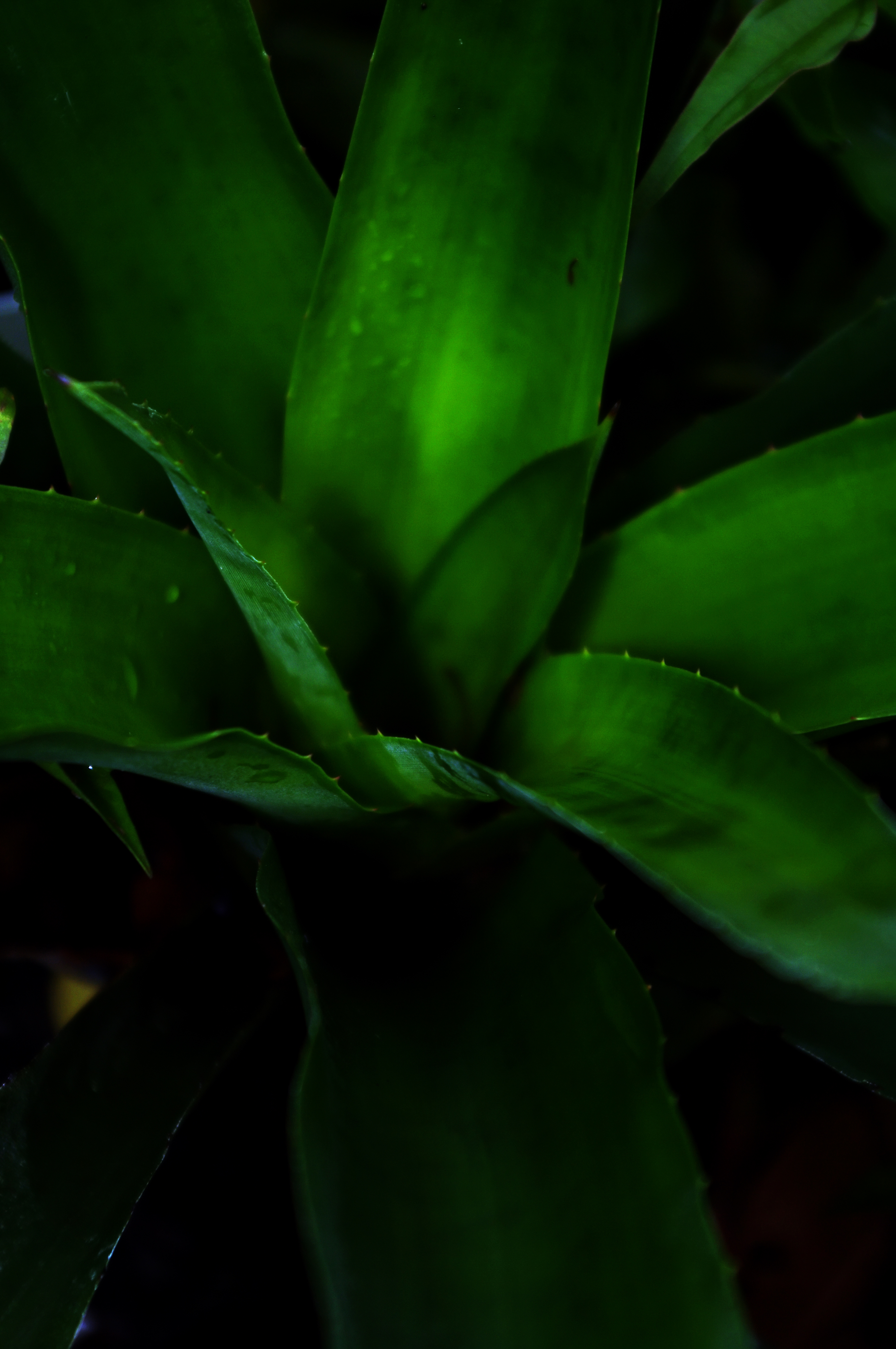
- Aechmea sphaerocephala

Scientific classification
- Kingdom: Plantae
- Clade: Tracheophytes
- Clade: Angiosperms
- Clade: Monocots
- Clade: Commelinids
- Order: Poales
- Family: Bromeliaceae
- Genus: Aechmea
- Subgenus: Aechmea subg. Chevaliera (Gaudichaud ex Beer) Baker

Species
- See text

= Aechmea subg. Chevaliera =

Subgenus of flowering plants

Chevaliera is a subgenus of the genus Aechmea.

== Species ==
Species accepted by Encyclopedia of Bromeliads as of October 2022:

- Aechmea aguadocensis Leme & L.Kollmann
- Aechmea cardenasii Aguirre-Santoro & Betancur
- Aechmea cariocae L.B.Sm.
- Aechmea castanea L.B.Sm.
- Aechmea conifera L.B.Sm.
- Aechmea digitata L.B.Sm. & Read
- Aechmea fernandae (E.Morren) Baker
- Aechmea heterosepala Leme
- Aechmea leucolepis L.B.Sm.
- Aechmea magdalenae (André) André ex Baker
- Aechmea microcephala E.Pereira & Leme
- Aechmea mira Leme & H.Luther
- Aechmea muricata (Arruda da Camara) L.B.Sm.
- Aechmea pallida L.B.Sm.
- Aechmea paratiensis Leme & Fraga
- Aechmea perforata L.B.Sm.
- Aechmea recurvipetala Leme & L.Kollmann
- Aechmea rubiginosa Mez
- Aechmea serragrandensis Leme & J A Siqueira
- Aechmea sphaerocephala Baker
- Aechmea strobilacea L.B.Sm.
- Aechmea tayoensis Gilmartin
- Aechmea timida Leme
