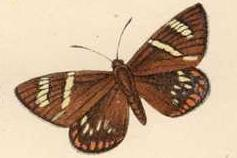

Scientific classification
- Kingdom: Animalia
- Phylum: Arthropoda
- Class: Insecta
- Order: Lepidoptera
- Family: Castniidae
- Genus: Geyeria
- Species: G. hubneri

Binomial name
- Geyeria hubneri (Latreille, 1830)

Synonyms
- Castnia hubneri Latreille, 1830; Castnia sternbergii Kollar, 1839; Geyeria castnioides Buchecker, [1880]; Castnia hubneri f. impura Strand, 1913; Castnia hubneri f. indecora Strand, 1913; Castnia hubneri ab. flavidior Rothschild, 1919

= Geyeria hubneri =

Species of moth

Geyeria hubneri is a moth in the Castniidae family. It is found in Brazil.
