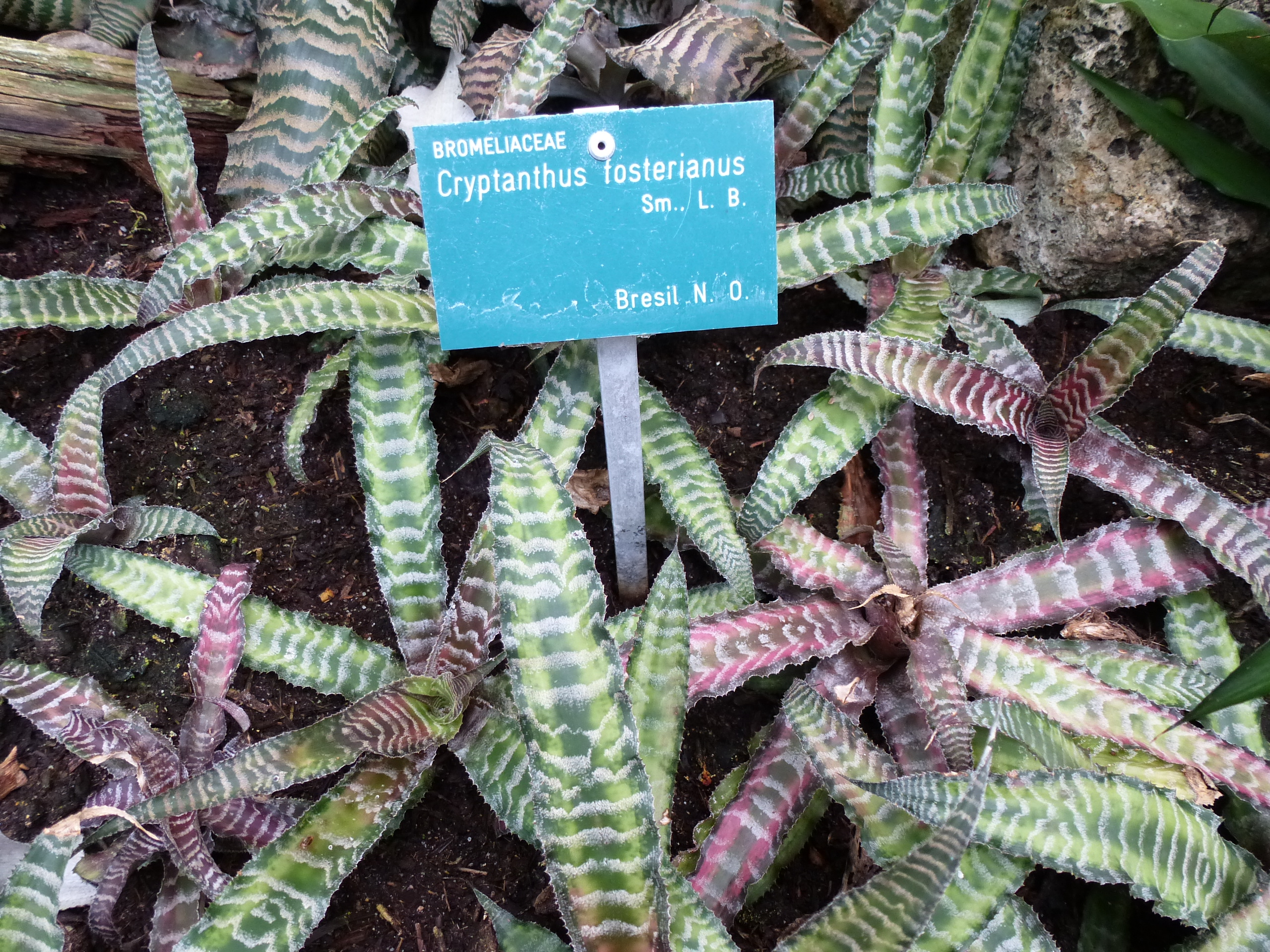

Scientific classification
- Kingdom: Plantae
- Clade: Tracheophytes
- Clade: Angiosperms
- Clade: Monocots
- Clade: Commelinids
- Order: Poales
- Family: Bromeliaceae
- Genus: Cryptanthus
- Species: C. fosterianus

Binomial name
- Cryptanthus fosterianus L.B.Sm.

= Cryptanthus fosterianus =

Species of plant

Cryptanthus fosterianus is a plant species in the genus Cryptanthus. This species is endemic to Brazil.

== Cultivars ==
- Cryptanthus 'Australian Sunrise'
- Cryptanthus 'Autumn Tones'
- Cryptanthus 'Beef Steak'
- Cryptanthus 'Big Brown'
- Cryptanthus 'Bits of Silver'
- Cryptanthus 'Black Joe'
- Cryptanthus 'Blush Kay'
- Cryptanthus 'Breakaway'
- Cryptanthus 'Bronze Beauty Kay'
- Cryptanthus 'Burgundy Beauty Kay'
- Cryptanthus 'Burgundy Glow Kay'
- Cryptanthus 'Burgundy Ripple Kay'
- Cryptanthus 'Candy Beauty Kay'
- Cryptanthus 'Cheerful'
- Cryptanthus 'Cloudcover'
- Cryptanthus 'Coral Bates'
- Cryptanthus 'Crystal Jackson'
- Cryptanthus 'Dark Fire'
- Cryptanthus 'Dark Light'
- Cryptanthus 'Dark Star'
- Cryptanthus 'Deloris Will'
- Cryptanthus 'Dusty Kay'
- Cryptanthus 'Ebb Tide'
- Cryptanthus 'Elaine'
- Cryptanthus 'Eureka'
- Cryptanthus 'Evelyn'
- Cryptanthus 'First Snowfall'
- Cryptanthus 'Foster's Lace'
- Cryptanthus 'Foster's Zone'
- Cryptanthus 'Frosted Beauty'
- Cryptanthus 'Frostie Kay'
- Cryptanthus 'Gladys Kay'
- Cryptanthus 'Glory Kay'
- Cryptanthus 'Graciela Lopez'
- Cryptanthus 'Grey Glow Kay'
- Cryptanthus 'Grey Haze Kay'
- Cryptanthus 'Greyling'
- Cryptanthus 'Houston'
- Cryptanthus 'Hurricane'
- Cryptanthus 'Hush'
- Cryptanthus 'Indian Maid (Maiden)'
- Cryptanthus 'Jeanie Kay'
- Cryptanthus 'Jedda'
- Cryptanthus 'Joan'
- Cryptanthus 'Joe'
- Cryptanthus 'John T. Files'
- Cryptanthus 'Koning'
- Cryptanthus 'Lime Frost'
- Cryptanthus 'Lime 'N Tan'
- Cryptanthus 'Lyric'
- Cryptanthus 'MacFoster'
- Cryptanthus 'MacGregor'
- Cryptanthus 'Madgan'
- Cryptanthus 'Madness'
- Cryptanthus 'Margaret'
- Cryptanthus 'Maroochy'
- Cryptanthus 'Medusa'
- Cryptanthus 'Melanie'
- Cryptanthus 'Midnight Kay'
- Cryptanthus 'Mistic Gem Kay'
- Cryptanthus 'Moonbeam'
- Cryptanthus 'Moonlight'
- Cryptanthus 'Music'
- Cryptanthus 'Norma'
- Cryptanthus 'Over The Moon'
- Cryptanthus 'Pat'
- Cryptanthus 'Peppered Bronze'
- Cryptanthus 'Perfection Kay'
- Cryptanthus 'Pink Brocade'
- Cryptanthus 'Pink Pants'
- Cryptanthus 'Pride of Place'
- Cryptanthus 'Racinae'
- Cryptanthus 'Racine Foster'
- Cryptanthus 'Rage'
- Cryptanthus 'Red Beauty'
- Cryptanthus 'Red Frost'
- Cryptanthus 'Reverie'
- Cryptanthus 'Ripple Haze Kay'
- Cryptanthus 'Ripple Wine Kay'
- Cryptanthus 'Rosy Kay'
- Cryptanthus 'Rosy Mottle Kay'
- Cryptanthus 'Scotch Mist'
- Cryptanthus 'Sea Song'
- Cryptanthus 'Seven Veils'
- Cryptanthus 'Shockwave'
- Cryptanthus 'Silver Dust Kay'
- Cryptanthus 'Silver Song'
- Cryptanthus 'Silver Waves Kay'
- Cryptanthus 'Sing Song'
- Cryptanthus 'Smokie Kay'
- Cryptanthus 'Soft Shades'
- Cryptanthus 'Soft Shadows'
- Cryptanthus 'Sophia'
- Cryptanthus 'Southern Star'
- Cryptanthus 'Spellbound'
- Cryptanthus 'Stained Glass'
- Cryptanthus 'Starfish'
- Cryptanthus 'Sugar Coated Chocolate'
- Cryptanthus 'Sylvie Langdon'
- Cryptanthus 'Symphony'
- Cryptanthus 'Twirl'
- Cryptanthus 'Wild Honey'
- Cryptanthus 'Zodiac'
- xNeotanthus 'Coco Loco'
- xNeotanthus 'Coconut Grove'
