= Guzmania sphaeroidea =

Scientific classification
- Kingdom: Plantae
- Clade: Tracheophytes
- Clade: Angiosperms
- Clade: Monocots
- Clade: Commelinids
- Order: Poales
- Family: Bromeliaceae
- Genus: Guzmania
- Species: G. sphaeroidea

Binomial name
- Guzmania sphaeroidea (André) André ex Mez

Synonyms
- Caraguata sphaeroidea André; Guzmania geniculata L.B.Sm.; Guzmania venamensis L.B.Sm.

Species of plant

Guzmania sphaeroidea is a species of flowering plant in the Bromeliaceae family. It is native to Bolivia, Guyana, Peru, Panama, Colombia, Venezuela and Ecuador.
