= Neoregelia melanodonta =

Scientific classification
- Kingdom: Plantae
- Clade: Embryophytes
- Clade: Tracheophytes
- Clade: Spermatophytes
- Clade: Angiosperms
- Clade: Monocots
- Clade: Commelinids
- Order: Poales
- Family: Bromeliaceae
- Genus: Neoregelia
- Subgenus: Neoregelia subg. Neoregelia
- Species: N. melanodonta

Binomial name
- Neoregelia melanodonta L.B.Sm.

Species of flowering plant

Neoregelia melanodonta is a species of flowering plant in the genus Neoregelia. It is endemic to Brazil.

== Cultivars ==
- Neoregelia 'Bananas Foster'
- Neoregelia 'Beef Wellington'
- Neoregelia 'Bella'
- Neoregelia 'Blue Navy Blues'
- Neoregelia 'Bubblin' Over'
- Neoregelia 'Cathedral'
- Neoregelia 'Everglades'
- Neoregelia 'Helga's Joy'
- Neoregelia 'Kawika'
- Neoregelia 'Lost Horizon'
- Neoregelia 'Mitch Gos'
- Neoregelia 'Pandora'
- Neoregelia 'Prinz's Pride'
- Neoregelia 'Purple Heart'
- Neoregelia 'Ronald'
- Neoregelia 'Rosy'
- Neoregelia 'Rousseau'
- Neoregelia 'Seminole Warpaint'
- Neoregelia 'Shangri-La'
- Neoregelia 'Zodonta'
