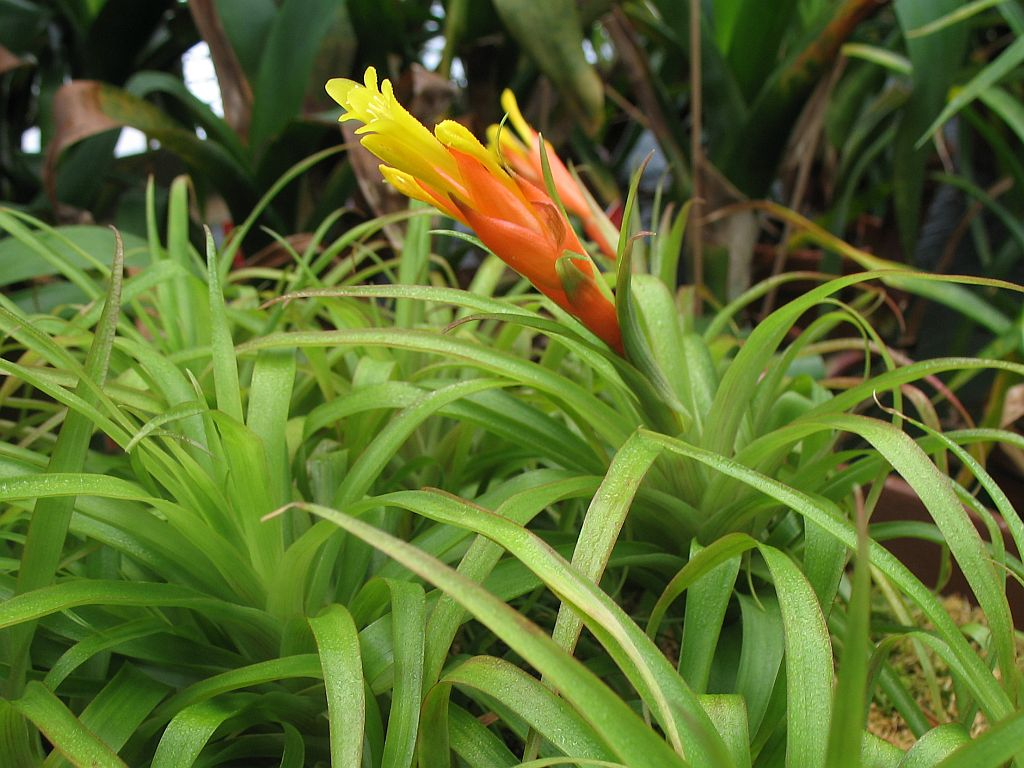

Scientific classification
- Kingdom: Plantae
- Clade: Tracheophytes
- Clade: Angiosperms
- Clade: Monocots
- Clade: Commelinids
- Order: Poales
- Family: Bromeliaceae
- Genus: Guzmania
- Species: G. angustifolia

Binomial name
- Guzmania angustifolia (Baker) Wittm.

Synonyms
- Caraguata angustifolia Baker

= Guzmania angustifolia =

Species of plant

Guzmania angustifolia is a species of flowering plant in the Bromeliaceae family. It is native to Costa Rica, Nicaragua, Panama, Colombia, and Ecuador.
