= Aechmea castanea =

Scientific classification
- Kingdom: Plantae
- Clade: Tracheophytes
- Clade: Angiosperms
- Clade: Monocots
- Clade: Commelinids
- Order: Poales
- Family: Bromeliaceae
- Genus: Aechmea
- Subgenus: Aechmea subg. Chevaliera
- Species: A. castanea

Binomial name
- Aechmea castanea L.B.Sm.

Synonyms
- Chevaliera castanea (L.B.Sm.) L.B.Sm. & W.J.Kress; Aechmea microcephala E.Pereira & Leme; Chevaliera microcephala (E.Pereira & Leme) L.B.Sm. & W.J.Kress

Species of flowering plant

Aechmea castanea is a plant species in the genus Aechmea. This species is endemic to State of Espírito Santo in Brazil.
