= Neoregelia fosteriana =

Scientific classification
- Kingdom: Plantae
- Clade: Embryophytes
- Clade: Tracheophytes
- Clade: Spermatophytes
- Clade: Angiosperms
- Clade: Monocots
- Clade: Commelinids
- Order: Poales
- Family: Bromeliaceae
- Genus: Neoregelia
- Subgenus: Neoregelia subg. Neoregelia
- Species: N. fosteriana

Binomial name
- Neoregelia fosteriana L.B.Sm.

Species of flowering plant

Neoregelia fosteriana is a species of flowering plant in the genus Neoregelia. It is endemic to Brazil.

== Cultivars ==
- Neoregelia 'Bingo'
- Neoregelia 'Blythe Spirit'
- Neoregelia 'City Lights'
- Neoregelia 'Fair Lady'
- Neoregelia 'Far Superior'
- Neoregelia 'Far-Fost'
- Neoregelia 'Fost Prince'
- Neoregelia 'Fost-Far'
- Neoregelia 'Frank Sinatra'
- Neoregelia 'Green Rosette'
- Neoregelia 'Harmony'
- Neoregelia 'Hot Spice'
- Neoregelia 'Marvelous Party'
- Neoregelia 'Orchid'
- Neoregelia 'Powder Puff'
- Neoregelia 'Prince Fost'
- Neoregelia 'Purple Fancy'
- Neoregelia 'Rose Apple'
- Neoregelia 'Secret Heart'
