= Vriesea minarum =

Scientific classification
- Kingdom: Plantae
- Clade: Tracheophytes
- Clade: Angiosperms
- Clade: Monocots
- Clade: Commelinids
- Order: Poales
- Family: Bromeliaceae
- Genus: Vriesea
- Species: V. minarum

Binomial name
- Vriesea minarum L.B. Smith

Species of flowering plant

Vriesea minarum is a plant species in the genus Vriesea. This species is native to Brazil.
