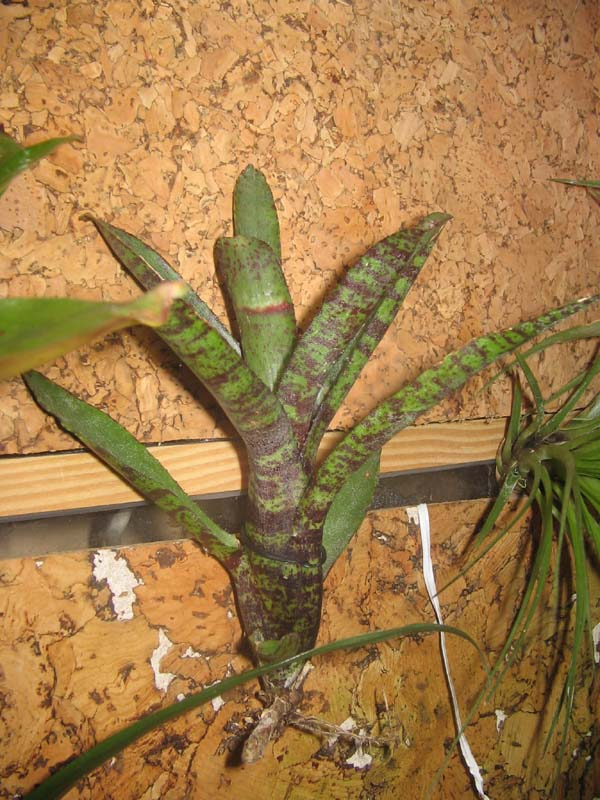

Scientific classification
- Kingdom: Plantae
- Clade: Embryophytes
- Clade: Tracheophytes
- Clade: Spermatophytes
- Clade: Angiosperms
- Clade: Monocots
- Clade: Commelinids
- Order: Poales
- Family: Bromeliaceae
- Genus: Neoregelia
- Subgenus: Neoregelia subg. Neoregelia
- Species: N. pauciflora

Binomial name
- Neoregelia pauciflora L.B.Sm.

= Neoregelia pauciflora =

Species of flowering plant

Neoregelia pauciflora is a species of flowering plant in the genus Neoregelia. It is endemic to Brazil. The specific epithet pauciflora is Latin for 'few-flowered'.

== Cultivars ==
- Neoregelia 'Ariel'
- Neoregelia 'Cheers'
- Neoregelia 'Clover'
- Neoregelia 'Domino'
- Neoregelia 'Frog Prince'
- Neoregelia 'Heart's Desire'
- Neoregelia 'Ink Spots'
- Neoregelia 'Jeanne Garman'
- Neoregelia 'Joybringer'
- Neoregelia 'Karamea Bon Ton'
- Neoregelia 'Karamea Mattino'
- Neoregelia 'Karamea Shadows'
- Neoregelia 'Natascha'
- Neoregelia 'Obsidian Ice'
- Neoregelia 'Ounce Of Purple'
- Neoregelia 'Pauciflora Red'
- Neoregelia 'Pauciflora Yellow'
- Neoregelia 'Purple Princess'
- Neoregelia 'Red Clover'
- Neoregelia 'Royal Flush'
- Neoregelia 'Shamrock'
- Neoregelia 'Tar Baby'
- Neoregelia 'Treasure Island'
