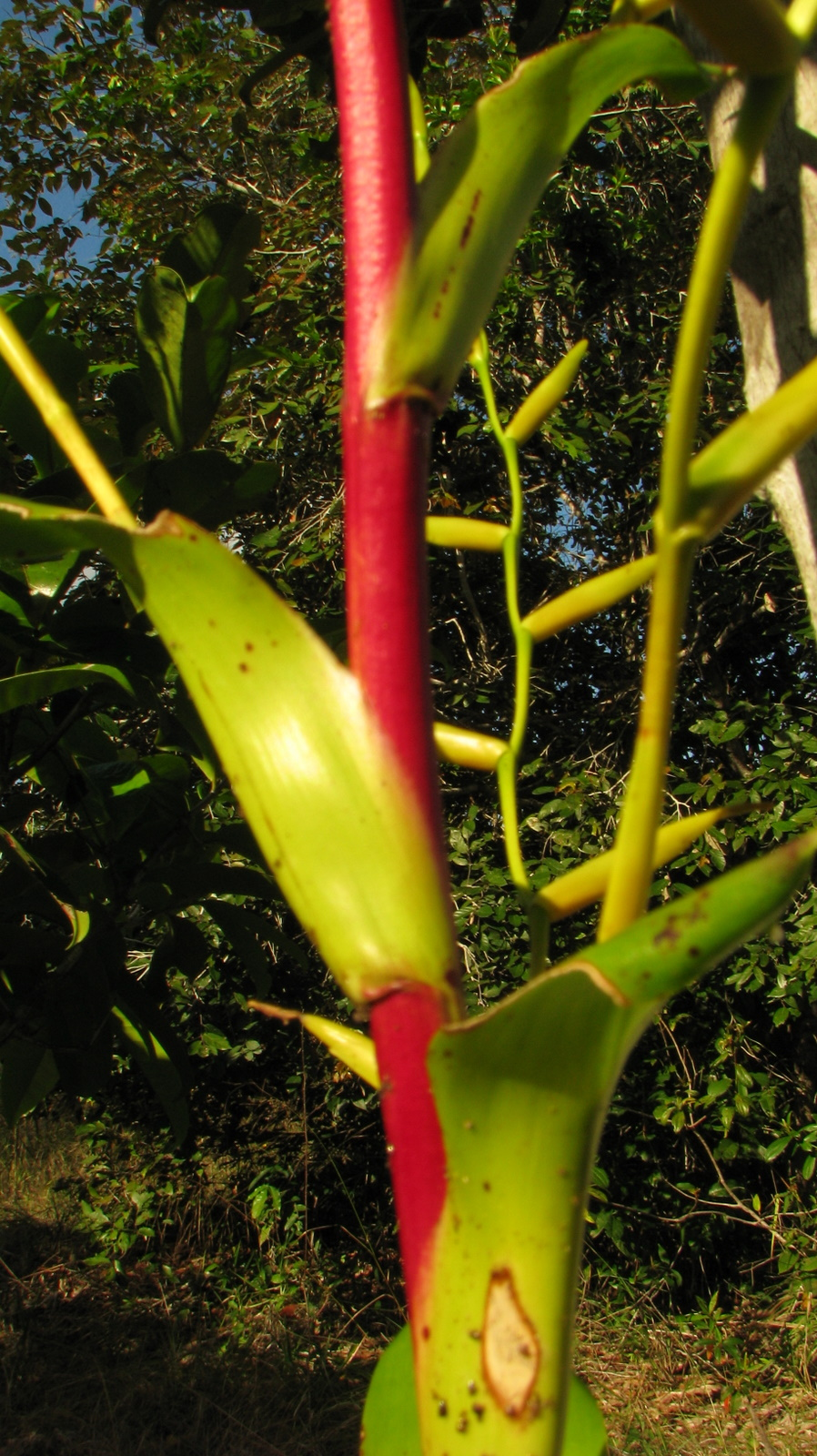
- Vriesea procera var. rubra

Scientific classification
- Kingdom: Plantae
- Clade: Tracheophytes
- Clade: Angiosperms
- Clade: Monocots
- Clade: Commelinids
- Order: Poales
- Family: Bromeliaceae
- Genus: Vriesea
- Species: V. procera

Binomial name
- Vriesea procera (Martius ex Schult. & Schult.f. ) Wittmack

Synonyms
- Vriesea gracilis Gaudich.; Tillandsia gracilis (Gaudich.) Griseb.; Tillandsia erectiflora Baker; Vriesea catharinensis F.J.Müll.; Tillandsia viscidula Britton; Tillandsia procera Mart. ex Schult. & Schult.f.; Tillandsia ernestii Mez

= Vriesea procera =

Species of epiphyte

Vriesea procera is a plant species in the genus Vriesea. This species is an epiphyte native to Trinidad and South America.

Four varieties are recognized:

1. Vriesea procera var. debilis Mez - Trinidad, southern + eastern Brazil
2. Vriesea procera var. procera - Trinidad, southern + eastern Brazil, Guianas, Venezuela, Bolivia, Argentina, Paraguay
3. Vriesea procera var. rubra L.B.Sm - Trinidad, eastern Brazil
4. Vriesea procera var. tenuis L.B.Sm - eastern Brazil from Bahia to São Paulo

== Cultivars ==
- Vriesea 'Acker Built'
