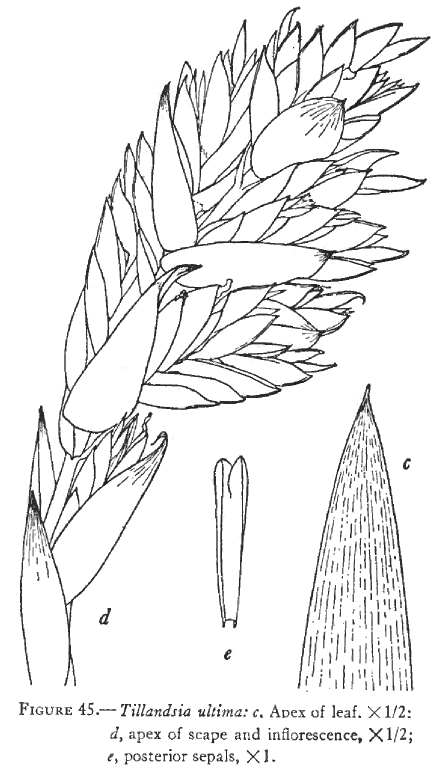
- Scientific illustration of 𝘛. 𝘶𝘭𝘵𝘪𝘮𝘢

Scientific classification
- Kingdom: Plantae
- Clade: Tracheophytes
- Clade: Angiosperms
- Clade: Monocots
- Clade: Commelinids
- Order: Poales
- Family: Bromeliaceae
- Genus: Tillandsia
- Subgenus: Tillandsia subg. Tillandsia
- Species: T. ultima

Binomial name
- Tillandsia ultima L.B.Sm.

= Tillandsia ultima =

Species of plant

Tillandsia ultima is a species of flowering plant in the genus Tillandsia that is native to Colombia and Ecuador. It was first discovered in Colombia in 1946 in the region of Magdalena.

== Description ==
Tillandsia ultima is an epiphyte. It is classified as endangered in the Colombian Red Book of Plants according to the IUCN Red List Categories and Criteria Version 3.1.

== Habitat ==
Tillandsia ultima inhabits the tropical savanna climate and the warm-summer mediterranean climate in Colombia and Ecuador at elevations around 3000 m.

== Cultivars ==
No cultivars are listed for this species in the BSI Cultivar Registry.
