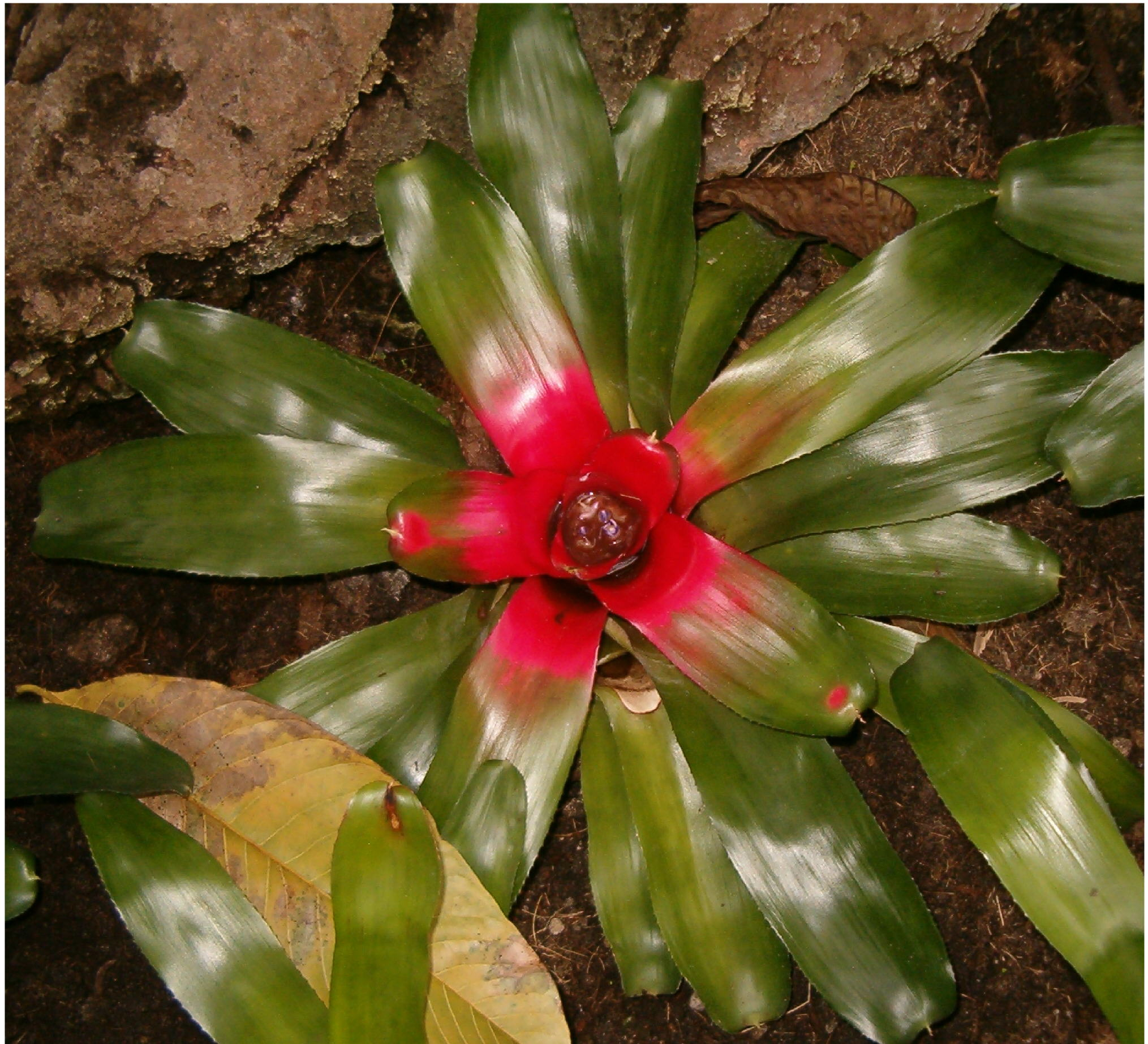

Scientific classification
- Kingdom: Plantae
- Clade: Tracheophytes
- Clade: Angiosperms
- Clade: Monocots
- Clade: Commelinids
- Order: Poales
- Family: Bromeliaceae
- Genus: Neoregelia
- Subgenus: Neoregelia subg. Neoregelia
- Species: N. carolinae

Binomial name
- Neoregelia carolinae (Beer) L.B.Sm.

= Neoregelia carolinae =

Species of flowering plant

Neoregelia carolinae, the blushing bromeliad, is a species of flowering plant in the genus Neoregelia. It is noted for its centre turning red when it's about to flower, from where the common name (blushing) is derived. This species is endemic to Brazil.
