= Aechmea perforata =

Scientific classification
- Kingdom: Plantae
- Clade: Tracheophytes
- Clade: Angiosperms
- Clade: Monocots
- Clade: Commelinids
- Order: Poales
- Family: Bromeliaceae
- Genus: Aechmea
- Subgenus: Aechmea subg. Chevaliera
- Species: A. perforata

Binomial name
- Aechmea perforata L.B.Sm.

Synonyms
- Chevaliera perforata (L.B.Sm.) L.B.Sm. & W.J.Kress

Species of flowering plant

Aechmea perforata is a bromeliad native to Brazil, States of Bahia and Espírito Santo. This plant is often used as an ornamental plant.
