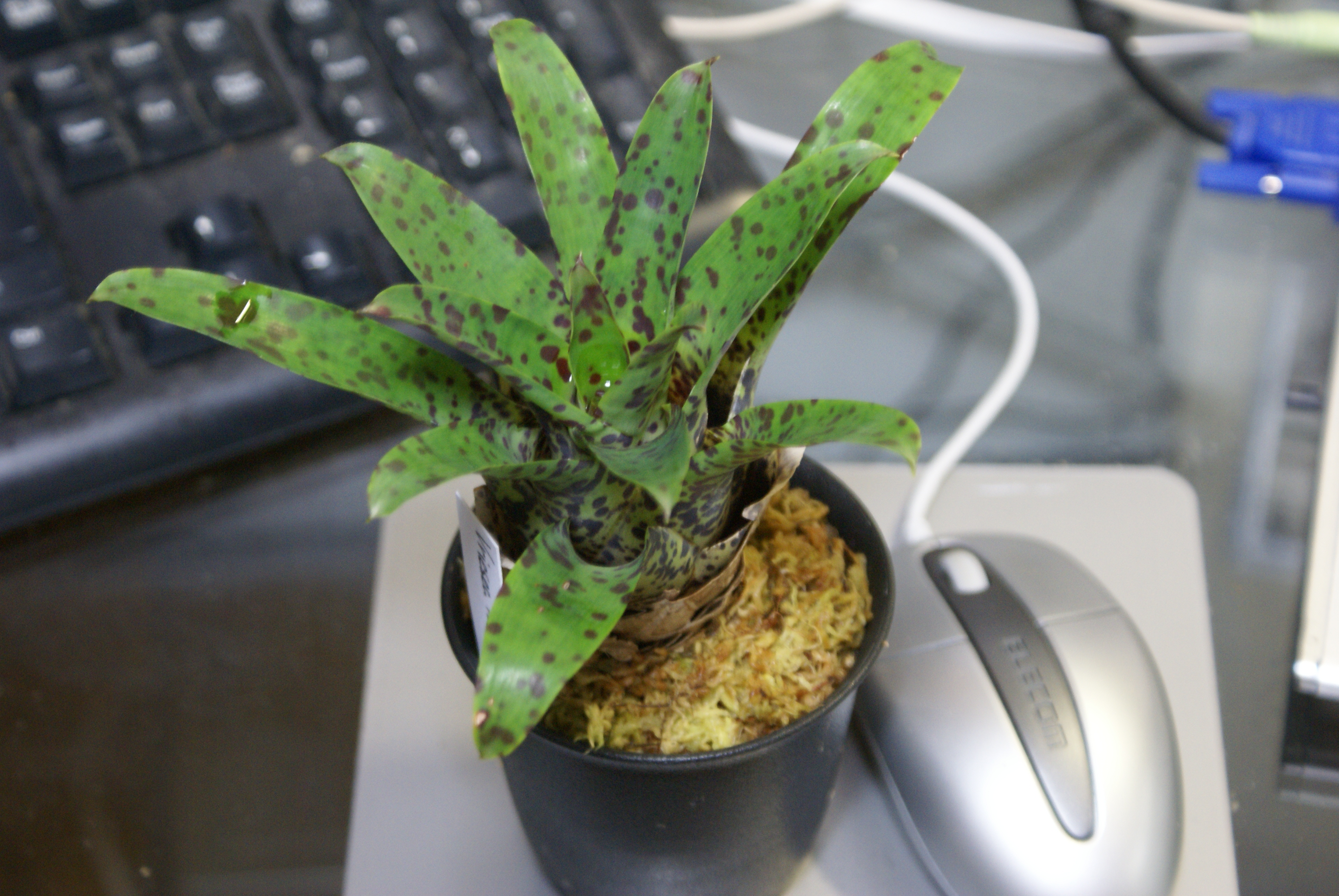

Scientific classification
- Kingdom: Plantae
- Clade: Tracheophytes
- Clade: Angiosperms
- Clade: Monocots
- Clade: Commelinids
- Order: Poales
- Family: Bromeliaceae
- Genus: Vriesea
- Species: V. racinae

Binomial name
- Vriesea racinae L.B.Smith

= Vriesea racinae =

Species of epiphyte

Vriesea racinae is a plant species in the genus Vriesea. This species is an epiphyte endemic to Brazil. known from the States of Espírito Santo and Minas Gerais.

== Cultivars ==
- Vriesea 'Chiquita'
- Vriesea 'Glossy Girl'
- Vriesea 'Honeycomb'
- Vriesea 'Kerryana'
- Vriesea 'Pamela Leaver'
- Vriesea 'Yvonne'
