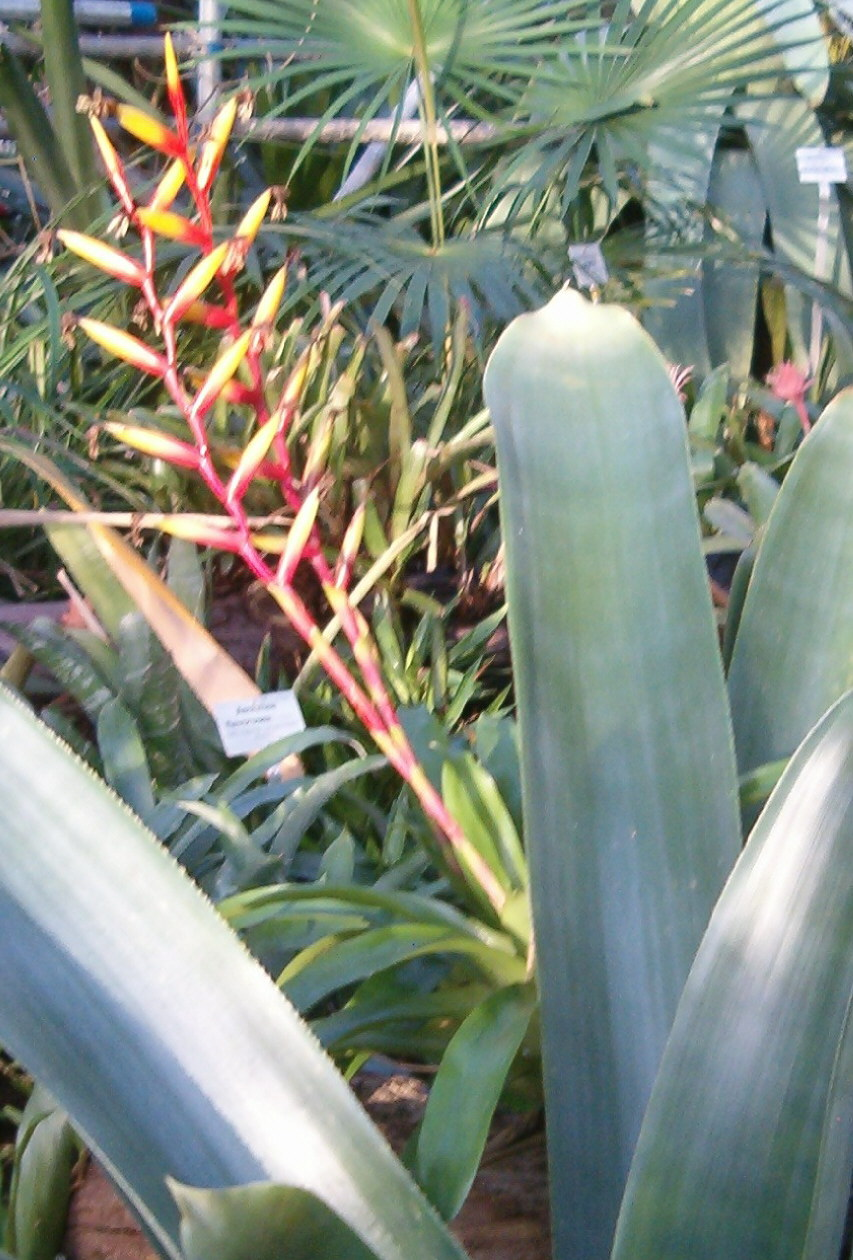

Scientific classification
- Kingdom: Plantae
- Clade: Tracheophytes
- Clade: Angiosperms
- Clade: Monocots
- Clade: Commelinids
- Order: Poales
- Family: Bromeliaceae
- Genus: Vriesea
- Species: V. platynema

Binomial name
- Vriesea platynema Gaudichaud

Synonyms
- Tillandsia platynema (Gaudich.) Griseb.; Vriesea corallina Regel; Encholirium corallinum (Regel) Linden; Encholirium roseum Antoine; Guzmania wrightii L.B.Sm.; Vriesea wrightii (L.B.Sm.) Carabia

= Vriesea platynema =

Species of flowering plant

Vriesea platynema is a plant species in the genus Vriesea. This species is native to the West Indies and South America.

Three varieties are recognized:

1. Vriesea platynema var. flava Reitz - State of Santa Catarina in Brazil
2. Vriesea platynema var. platynema - Cuba, Jamaica, Trinidad, Venezuela (including Venezuelan Antilles), Guyana, Brazil, Misiones Province of Argentina
3. Vriesea platynema var. wrightii (L.B.Sm.) L.B.Sm. - Cuba

== Cultivars ==
- Vriesea 'Cadbury'
- Vriesea 'Charles W.'
- Vriesea 'Filagree'
- Vriesea 'Golden Plaits'
- Vriesea 'Griesseniana'
- Vriesea 'Karamea Granada'
- Vriesea 'RoRo'
