= Aechmea strobilacea =

Scientific classification
- Kingdom: Plantae
- Clade: Tracheophytes
- Clade: Angiosperms
- Clade: Monocots
- Clade: Commelinids
- Order: Poales
- Family: Bromeliaceae
- Genus: Aechmea
- Subgenus: Aechmea subg. Chevaliera
- Species: A. strobilacea

Binomial name
- Aechmea strobilacea L.B.Sm.

Synonyms
- Chevaliera strobilacea (L.B.Sm.) L.B.Sm. & W.J.Kress

Species of plant

Aechmea strobilacea is a plant species in the genus Aechmea. This species is native to Ecuador, Peru and Panama.
