= Vriesea friburgensis =

Scientific classification
- Kingdom: Plantae
- Clade: Embryophytes
- Clade: Tracheophytes
- Clade: Spermatophytes
- Clade: Angiosperms
- Clade: Monocots
- Clade: Commelinids
- Order: Poales
- Family: Bromeliaceae
- Genus: Vriesea
- Species: V. friburgensis

Binomial name
- Vriesea friburgensis Mez

Synonyms
- Vriesea paludosa L.B.Sm.; Vriesea tucumanensis Mez; Vriesea caldasiana Mez; Vrieseida foetida Rojas Acosta; Vriesea argentinensis Speg.

Species of epiphyte

Vriesea friburgensis is a speciees of flowering plant in the family Bromeliaceae. This species is an epiphyte native to Argentina, Bolivia, Brazil, and Paraguay.

== Taxonomy ==
=== Varieties ===
Recognized varieties include:

- Vriesea friburgensis var. friburgensis - eastern + southern Brazil
- Vriesea friburgensis var. paludosa (L.B.Sm.) L.B.Sm. - southeastern Brazil from São Paulo to Rio Grande do Sul
- Vriesea friburgensis var. tucumanensis (Mez) L.B.Sm. - most of species range

=== Cultivars ===
Recognized cultivars include:

- Vriesea 'Jubilation'
- Vriesea 'Little Dumplin'
- xVrieslandsia 'Red Dawn'<

== Ecology ==
The large infructescences of the plant dry up and may remain standing for a year or more, during which time they are inhabited by a variety of insect species and other arthropods. Several species of ants, termites, and bees build nests in the dry fruiting structure. Surveys have revealed the nests of ants in the genera Camponotus, Pseudomyrmex, and Solenopsis, and termites of the genera Cortaritermes and Velocitermes. Other inhabitants of the plant include giant butterfly-moths, hoverflies, beetles, pseudoscorpions, springtails, and spiders.
