= Aechmea leucolepis =

Scientific classification
- Kingdom: Plantae
- Clade: Embryophytes
- Clade: Tracheophytes
- Clade: Spermatophytes
- Clade: Angiosperms
- Clade: Monocots
- Clade: Commelinids
- Order: Poales
- Family: Bromeliaceae
- Genus: Aechmea
- Subgenus: Aechmea subg. Chevaliera
- Species: A. leucolepis

Binomial name
- Aechmea leucolepis L.B.Sm.

Synonyms
- Chevaliera leucolepis (L.B.Sm.) L.B.Sm. & W.J.Kress

Species of flowering plant

Aechmea leucolepis is a plant species in the genus Aechmea. This species is endemic to eastern Brazil from Bahia to Espírito Santo.
