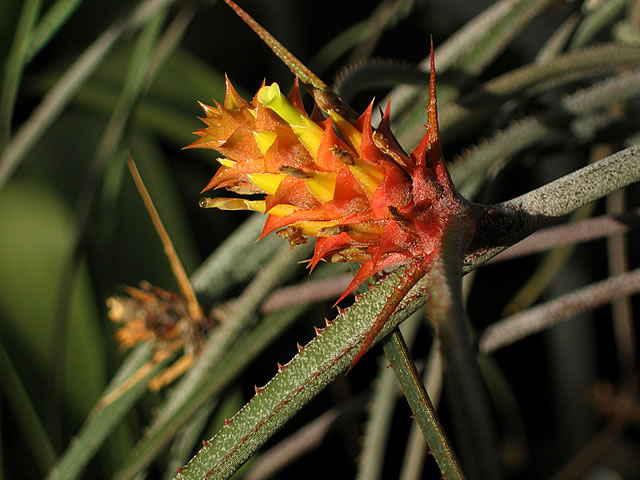

Scientific classification
- Kingdom: Plantae
- Clade: Tracheophytes
- Clade: Angiosperms
- Clade: Monocots
- Clade: Commelinids
- Order: Poales
- Family: Bromeliaceae
- Genus: Acanthostachys
- Species: A. strobilacea

Binomial name
- Acanthostachys strobilacea (Schultes f.) Klotzsch

= Acanthostachys strobilacea =

Species of flowering plant

Acanthostachys strobilacea is a plant species in the genus Acanthostachys. This species is native to Brazil, Paraguay and Argentina.
