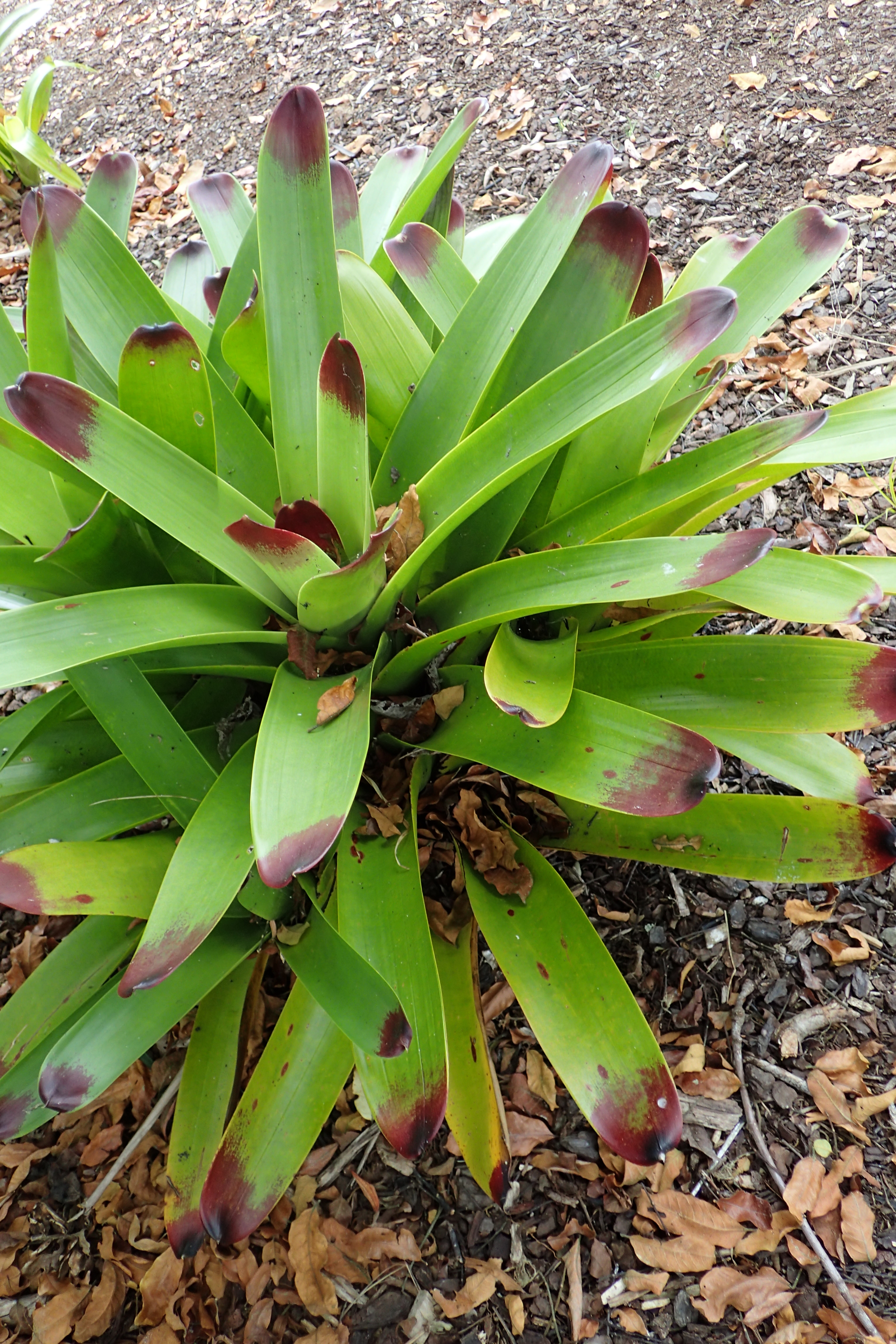
- Vriesea philippocoburgii

Scientific classification
- Kingdom: Plantae
- Clade: Tracheophytes
- Clade: Angiosperms
- Clade: Monocots
- Clade: Commelinids
- Order: Poales
- Family: Bromeliaceae
- Genus: Vriesea
- Species: V. philippocoburgii

Binomial name
- Vriesea philippocoburgii Wawra

= Vriesea philippocoburgii =

Species of flowering plant

Vriesea philippocoburgii is a plant species in the genus Vriesea. This species is endemic to Brazil.

== Cultivars ==
- Vriesea 'Absolutely Fabulous'
- Vriesea 'Aussie Joy'
- Vriesea 'Furcata'
- Vriesea 'Katelyn Woods'
- Vriesea 'Little Phil'
- Vriesea 'Nicci Isley'
- Vriesea 'Phillip'
- Vriesea 'Pink Gusher'
- Vriesea 'Rafael'
