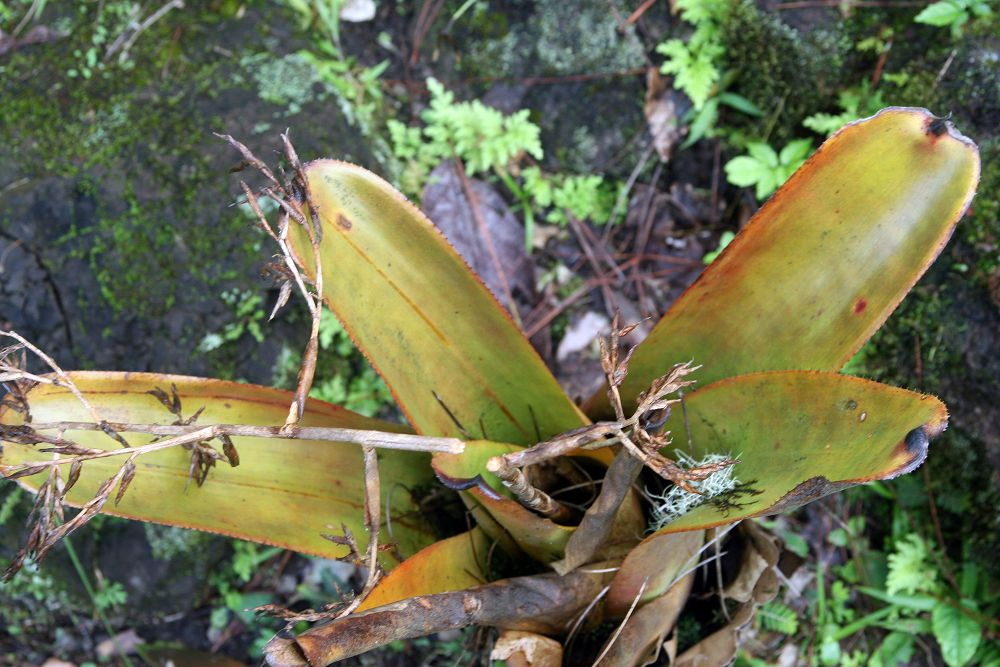
- Aechmea mulfordii at the Wilson Botanical Garden, Las Cruces Biological Station, Costa Rica

Scientific classification
- Kingdom: Plantae
- Clade: Embryophytes
- Clade: Tracheophytes
- Clade: Spermatophytes
- Clade: Angiosperms
- Clade: Monocots
- Clade: Commelinids
- Order: Poales
- Family: Bromeliaceae
- Genus: Aechmea
- Subgenus: Aechmea subg. Aechmea
- Species: A. mulfordii

Binomial name
- Aechmea mulfordii L.B.Sm.

Synonyms
- Gravisia fosteriana L.B.Sm.

= Aechmea mulfordii =

Living vase bromelia

Species of flowering plant

Aechmea mulfordii, the living vase bromelia, is native to the states of Pernambuco and Bahia in eastern Brazil. Most of the other plants in this genus are epiphytic, which means that they live up in the branches of the trees and exist mainly on the moisture and nutrients they obtain from the air. However, Aechmea mulfordii is a large terrestrial plant, growing near the sea level on sand dunes.

Aechmea mulfordii has leathery green leaves ligulate or sword-shaped. The leaves may grow to 1 m (3 ft) in length, at times much less, and form a central vase, which, in cultivation, should be kept filled with water. On this species, the primary bract greatly exceeds the lowermost branch. The flower-spikes sent up from the heart or crown of the plant are red panicle with the three outer sepaloid segments longer than the three inner or petaloid ones. Frequently confused with A. rubens and A. emmerichiae, A. mulfordii has less dense and elaborate inflorescence than A. rubens and the long, broad floral bracts conceal the ovary.

== Etymology ==
The name of the genus Aechmea has been given by taxonomists because of the characteristically sharp points of the sepals and of the bracts covering the flower buds. The word aechmea comes from the Greek word "aichme" which means "spear tip".
