= Guzmania condorensis =

Conservation status
- Endangered (IUCN 3.1)

Scientific classification
- Kingdom: Plantae
- Clade: Tracheophytes
- Clade: Angiosperms
- Clade: Monocots
- Clade: Commelinids
- Order: Poales
- Family: Bromeliaceae
- Genus: Guzmania
- Species: G. condorensis

Binomial name
- Guzmania condorensis H.Luther

Species of flowering plant

Guzmania condorensis is a species of plant in the family Bromeliaceae. It is an epiphyte endemic to southeastern Ecuador. Its natural habitat is subtropical or tropical moist montane forests. It is threatened by habitat loss.
