= Aechmea roeseliae =

Conservation status
- Vulnerable (IUCN 3.1)

Scientific classification
- Kingdom: Plantae
- Clade: Tracheophytes
- Clade: Angiosperms
- Clade: Monocots
- Clade: Commelinids
- Order: Poales
- Family: Bromeliaceae
- Genus: Aechmea
- Subgenus: Aechmea subg. Aechmea
- Species: A. roeseliae

Binomial name
- Aechmea roeseliae H.Luther

Species of flowering plant

Aechmea roeseliae is a species of flowering plant in the family Bromeliaceae. It is an epiphyte endemic to Ecuador, where it is known from Napo and El Oro provinces. Its natural habitat is tropical Andean lower montane rain forests from 1,000 to 1,500 metres elevation. It is threatened by habitat loss.

The species was described by Harry E. Luther in 1998.
