= Aechmea patriciae =

Conservation status
- Vulnerable (IUCN 3.1)

Scientific classification
- Kingdom: Plantae
- Clade: Tracheophytes
- Clade: Angiosperms
- Clade: Monocots
- Clade: Commelinids
- Order: Poales
- Family: Bromeliaceae
- Genus: Aechmea
- Subgenus: Aechmea subg. Aechmea
- Species: A. patriciae

Binomial name
- Aechmea patriciae H.Luther

Species of flowering plant

Aechmea patriciae is a species of flowering plant in the family Bromeliaceae. It is an epiphyte endemic to Ecuador. Its natural habitat is lowland terre firme and seasonally flooded Amazon rainforest from 250 to 500 metres elevation. It is threatened by habitat loss.

The species was described by Harry Edward Luther in 1999.
