= Calliaspis rubra =

Scientific classification
- Kingdom: Animalia
- Phylum: Arthropoda
- Clade: Pancrustacea
- Class: Insecta
- Order: Coleoptera
- Suborder: Polyphaga
- Infraorder: Cucujiformia
- Family: Chrysomelidae
- Genus: Calliaspis
- Species: C. rubra

Binomial name
- Calliaspis rubra (Olivier, 1808)

Synonyms
- Cassida rubra Olivier, 1808

Species of beetle

Calliaspis rubra is a species of beetle of the family Chrysomelidae. It is found in Brazil, Colombia, Ecuador, French Guiana and Peru.

== Biology ==
The recorded food plant is Aechmea nallyi.
