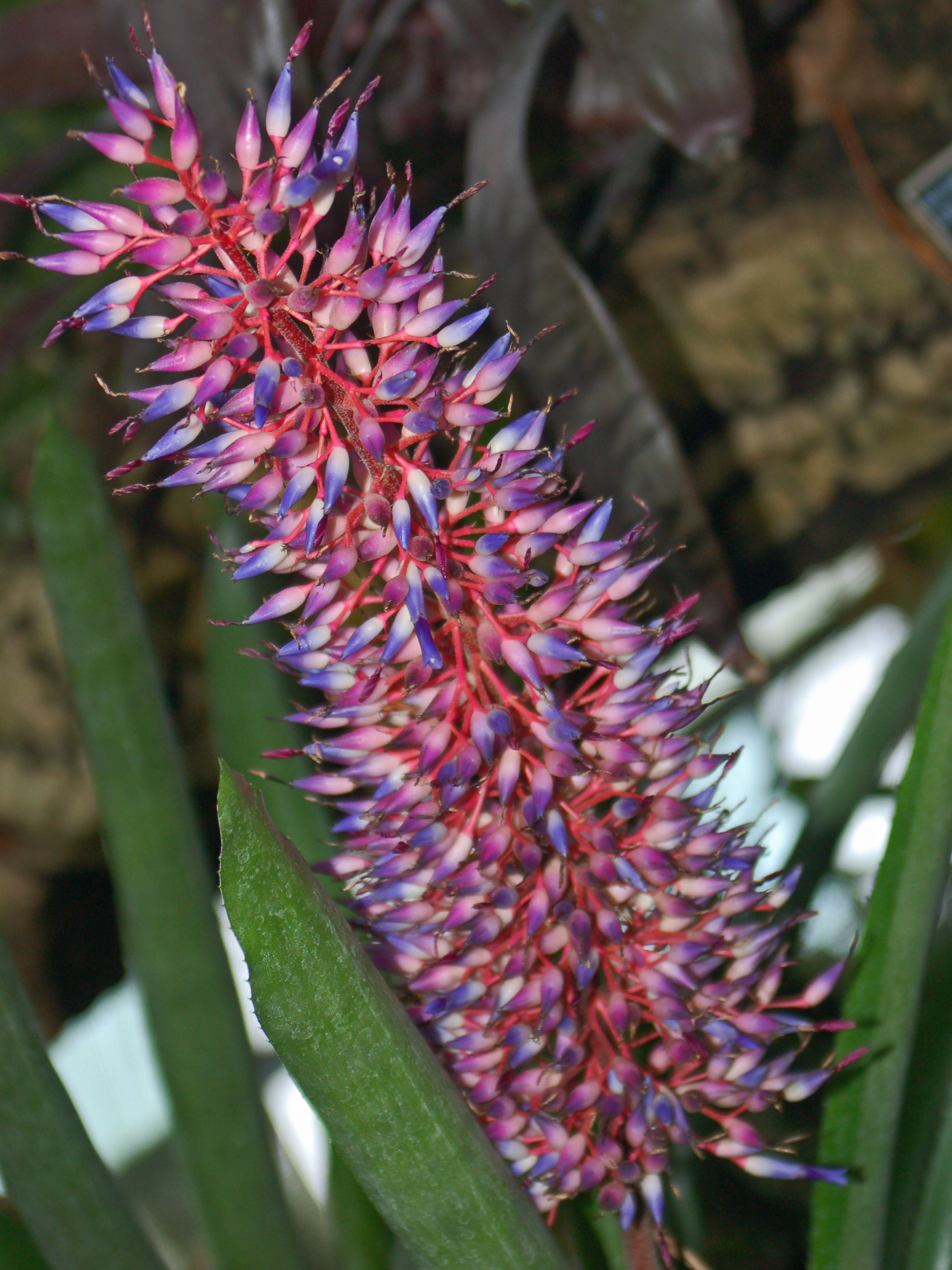
- Inflorescence of Aechmea fendleri

Scientific classification
- Kingdom: Plantae
- Clade: Tracheophytes
- Clade: Angiosperms
- Clade: Monocots
- Clade: Commelinids
- Order: Poales
- Family: Bromeliaceae
- Genus: Aechmea
- Subgenus: Aechmea subg. Aechmea; Baker

Species
- See text

= Aechmea subg. Aechmea =

Subgenus of flowering plants

Aechmea subg. Aechmea is a subgenus of the genus Aechmea.

== Species ==
Species accepted by Encyclopedia of Bromeliads as of October 2022:

| Image | Scientific name | Distribution |
|---|---|---|
| | Aechmea abbreviata L.B.Sm. | Ecuador. |
| | Aechmea aculeatosepala (Rauh & Barthlott) Leme | Ecuador |
| | Aechmea aiuruocensis Leme | Brazil (Minas Gerais) |
| | Aechmea amicorum B.R.Silva & H.Luther | Brazil (SE. Bahia to Espírito Santo) |
| | Aechmea ampla L.B.Sm. | Brazil (Bahia) |
| | Aechmea andaquiensis Betancur & AguirreSantoro | Colombia |
| | Aechmea angustifolia Poepp. & Endl. | Bolivia, Brazil North, Colombia, Costa Rica, Ecuador, French Guiana, Guyana, Honduras, Nicaragua, Panamá, Peru, Venezuela |
| | Aechmea aquilega (Salisb.) Griseb. | Brazil, Costa Rica, French Guiana, Guyana, Jamaica, Suriname, Trinidad-Tobago, Venezuela |
| | Aechmea araneosa L.B.Sm. | Brazil (Espírito Santo) |
| | Aechmea aripoensis (N.E.Brown) Pittendr. | Venezuela and Trinidad |
| | Aechmea atrovittata Leme & Siqueira | Brazil (Alagoas) |
| | Aechmea avaldoana Leme & W.Till | Brazil (Bahia) |
| | Aechmea azurea L.B.Sm. | Brazil (Espírito Santo) |
| | Aechmea bahiana L.B.Sm. | Brazil (Bahia) |
| | Aechmea bambusoides L.B.Sm. & Reitz | Brazil (Minas Gerais, Rio de Janeiro) |
| | Aechmea bauxilumii Ángel Fernández | Venezuela |
| | Aechmea bracteata (Sw.) Griseb. | Belize, Colombia, Costa Rica, Guatemala, Honduras, Mexico, Nicaragua, Panamá, Venezuela |
| | Aechmea brassicoides Baker | Guyana |
| | Aechmea callichroma Read & Baensch | Brazil (Sergipe) |
| | Aechmea castelnavii Baker | Bolivia, Brazil, Colombia, Costa Rica, Peru, Suriname, Venezuela |
| | Aechmea catendensis J.A.Siqueira & Leme | Brazil |
| | Aechmea cephaloides J.A.Siqueira & Leme | Brazil (Pernambuco) |
| | Aechmea confertiflora Aguirre-Santoro & Betancur | Colombia |
| | Aechmea confusa H.Luther | Peru |
| | Aechmea correia-araujoi Pereira & Moutinho | Brazil (Bahia) |
| | Aechmea costantinii (Mez) L.B.Sm. | Brazil |
| | Aechmea cymosopaniculata Baker | Venezuela (Aragua) |
| | Aechmea dactylina Baker | Colombia, Costa Rica, Ecuador, Nicaragua, Panamá |
| | Aechmea decurva Proctor | Jamaica |
| | Aechmea discordiae Leme | Brazil (Bahia) |
| | Aechmea disjuncta (L B Smith) Leme & J A Siqueira | Brazil (Bahia) |
| | Aechmea downsiana Pittendr. | Trinidad (Mt. Chaguaramal) |
| | Aechmea echinata (Leme) Leme | Brazil (Bahia) |
| | Aechmea egleriana L.B.Sm. | Brazil, French Guiana, Venezuela |
| | Aechmea emmerichiae Leme | Brazil (Chapada Diamantina) |
| | Aechmea entringeri Leme | Brazil (Espírito Santo) |
| | Aechmea eurycorymbus Harms | Brazil |
| | Aechmea fasciata (Lindl.) Baker | Brazil (Rio de Janeiro) |
| | Aechmea fendleri André ex Mez | Trinidad-Tobago, Venezuela |
| | Aechmea filicaulis (Griseb.) Mez | Venezuela |
| | Aechmea flavorosea E.Pereira | Brazil (Rio de Janeiro) |
| | Aechmea flemingii H.Luther | Leeward Island |
| | Aechmea fosteriana L.B.Sm. | Brazil (Espírito Santo) |
| | Aechmea grazielae Martinelli & Leme | Brazil (Rio de Janeiro). |
| | Aechmea guainumbiorum J A Siqueira & Leme | Brazil (Pernambuco) |
| | Aechmea guaratingensis Leme & L.Kollmann | Brazil (Bahia). |
| | Aechmea gurkeniana Pereira & Moutinho | Brazil (Bahia) |
| | Aechmea huebneri Harms | Brazil, Colombia |
| | Aechmea iguana Wittm. | Guatemala |
| | Aechmea jungurudoensis H.Luther & K.Norton | Panama |
| | Aechmea koesteri Manzan. | Ecuador |
| | Aechmea lactifera Leme & J.A.Siqueira | Brazil. |
| | Aechmea lanjouwii (L.B.Sm.) L.B.Sm.emend.E.J.Gouda | Suriname |
| | Aechmea lasseri L.B.Sm. | Venezuela |
| | Aechmea latifolia (Willd. ex Schult.f.) Klotzsch ex Baker | Colombia (Cundinamarca) |
| | Aechmea leptantha (Harms) Leme & J A Siqueira | Brazil (Paraíba, Pernambuco) |
| | Aechmea longicuspis Baker | Bolivia, Colombia, Ecuador, Peru |
| | Aechmea longiramosa Betancur & Aguirre-Santoro | Colombia |
| | Aechmea macrochlamys L.B.Sm. | Brazil (Espírito Santo) |
| | Aechmea marauensis Leme | Brazil |
| | Aechmea marginalis Leme & J.A.Siqueira | Brazil (Alagoas) |
| | Aechmea melinonii Hook. | Brazil, French Guiana, Guyana, Suriname |
| | Aechmea mertensii (Meyer) Schult. & Schult.f. | Bolivia, Brazil, Colombia, Ecuador, French Guiana, Guyana, Peru, Suriname, Trinidad-Tobago, Venezuela |
| | Aechmea milsteiniana L.B.Sm. & Read | Brazil (Espírito Santo, Minas Gerais) |
| | Aechmea mollis L.B.Sm. | Brazil (Bahia) |
| | Aechmea moonenii Gouda | Suriname, French Guiana. |
| | Aechmea mulfordii L.B.Sm. | Brazil (Pernambuco, Bahia) |
| | Aechmea mutica L.B.Sm. | Brazil (Espírito Santo) |
| | Aechmea nallyi L.B.Sm. | Colombia, Peru |
| | Aechmea nidularioides L.B.Sm. | Colombia, Ecuador, Peru |
| | Aechmea nivea L.B.Sm. | Colombia |
| | Aechmea orlandiana L.B.Sm. | Brazil (Espírito Santo) |
| | Aechmea paniculata Ruiz & Pav. | Peru |
| | Aechmea paniculigera (Sw.) Griseb. | Jamaica, Venezuela |
| | Aechmea paradoxa (Leme) Leme | Brazil (Bahia) |
| | Aechmea patriciae H.Luther | Ecuador |
| | Aechmea penduliflora André | Brazil, Colombia, Costa Rica, Ecuador, Guyana, Panamá, Peru, Venezuela |
| | Aechmea phanerophlebia Baker | Brazil. |
| | Aechmea politii L.B.Sm. | Colombia, French Guiana, Guyana, Venezuela |
| | Aechmea polyantha E.Pereira & Reitz | French Guiana to Brazil (Amazonas) |
| | Aechmea prancei L.B.Sm. | Brazil (Acre) |
| | Aechmea prava E.Pereira | Brazil (Rio de Janeiro) |
| | Aechmea pubescens Baker | Colombia, Costa Rica, Honduras, Nicaragua, Panamá, Venezuela |
| | Aechmea purpureorosea (Hook.) Wawra | Brazil. |
| | Aechmea pyramidalis Benth | Colombia, Ecuador, Peru |
| | Aechmea ramosa Mart. ex Schult. & Schult.f. | Brazil |
| | Aechmea ramusculosa Leme | Brazil (Bahia). |
| | Aechmea rodriguesiana (L.B.Sm.) L.B.Sm. | French Guiana to Brazil (Amazonas). |
| | Aechmea roeseliae H.Luther | Ecuador. |
| | Aechmea rubens (L.B.Sm.) L.B.Sm | Brazil. |
| | Aechmea rubrolilacina Leme | Brazil (Espírito Santo). |
| | Aechmea servitensis André | Colombia, Ecuador |
| | Aechmea setigera Mart. ex Schult. & Schult.f. | Bolivia, Brazil, Colombia, Ecuador, French Guiana, Panamá, Suriname, Venezuela |
| | Aechmea skotakii H.Luther ex Manzanares | Ecuador. |
| | Aechmea spectabilis (Linden ex Galeotti) Brongn. ex Houllet | Colombia, Venezuela |
| | Aechmea stenosepala L.B.Sm. | Colombia |
| | Aechmea streptocalycoides Philcox | Ecuador (Napo) to Peru |
| | Aechmea strobilina (Beurl.) L.B.Sm. & Read | Panama. |
| | Aechmea sucreana Martinelli & C.Vieira | Brazil (Espírito Santo). |
| | Aechmea tocantina Baker | Bolivia, Brazil, Colombia, French Guiana, Guyana, Suriname, Venezuela |
| | Aechmea tomentosa Mez | |
| | Aechmea vasquezii H.Luther | Peru. |
| | Aechmea viridipetala A.F.Costa & Amorim | Brazil (Bahia) |
| | Aechmea weberi (E.Pereira & Leme) Leme | Brazil (Bahia). |
| | Aechmea werdermannii Harms | Brazil (Pernambuco, Alagoas). |
| | Aechmea williamsii (L.B.Sm.) L.B.Sm. & M.A.Spencer | Brazil, Colombia, Ecuador, Peru |
| | Aechmea xinguana A.K.Koch, Ilkiu-Borg. & Forzza | Brazil (Pará) |
