= Aechmea williamsii =

Scientific classification
- Kingdom: Plantae
- Clade: Tracheophytes
- Clade: Angiosperms
- Clade: Monocots
- Clade: Commelinids
- Order: Poales
- Family: Bromeliaceae
- Genus: Aechmea
- Subgenus: Aechmea subg. Aechmea
- Species: A. williamsii

Binomial name
- Aechmea williamsii (L.B.Sm.) L.B.Sm. & M.A.Spencer

Synonyms
- Streptocalyx williamsii L.B.Sm.

Species of flowering plant

Aechmea williamsii is a species of flowering plant in the genus Aechmea. This species is native to Ecuador, Colombia, Peru, and northern Brazil.
