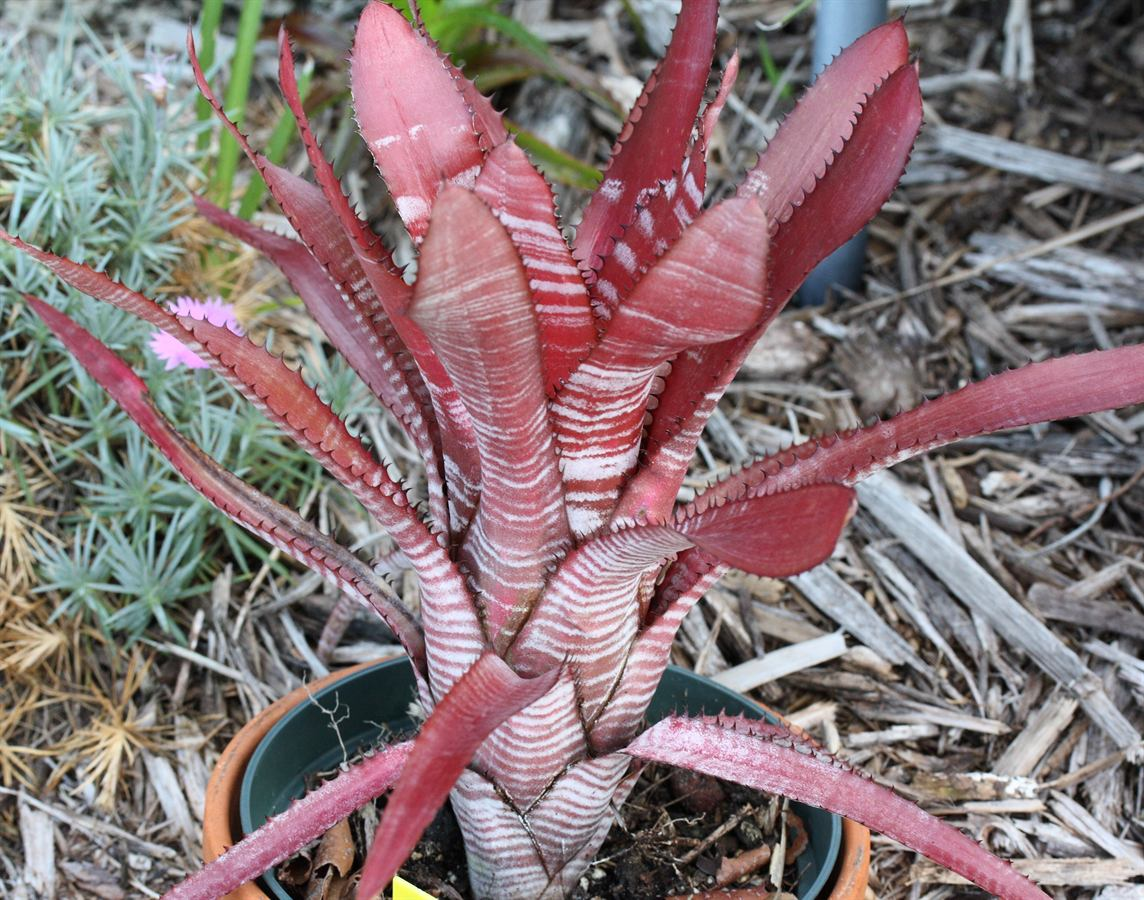

Scientific classification
- Kingdom: Plantae
- Clade: Tracheophytes
- Clade: Angiosperms
- Clade: Monocots
- Clade: Commelinids
- Order: Poales
- Family: Bromeliaceae
- Genus: Aechmea
- Subgenus: Aechmea subg. Aechmea
- Species: A. phanerophlebia

Binomial name
- Aechmea phanerophlebia Baker

= Aechmea phanerophlebia =

Species of flowering plant

Aechmea phanerophlebia is a species of flowering plant in the Bromeliaceae family. This species is endemic to Brazil.

== Cultivars ==
- Aechmea 'Tessie'
