= Aechmea lasseri =

Scientific classification
- Kingdom: Plantae
- Clade: Tracheophytes
- Clade: Angiosperms
- Clade: Monocots
- Clade: Commelinids
- Order: Poales
- Family: Bromeliaceae
- Genus: Aechmea
- Subgenus: Aechmea subg. Aechmea
- Species: A. lasseri

Binomial name
- Aechmea lasseri L.B.Sm.

Species of flowering plant

Aechmea lasseri is a plant species in the genus Aechmea. This species is endemic to Venezuela. This plant is epiphytic.

== Cultivars ==
- Aechmea 'Pink Dusty'
- × Billmea 'Lazslo'
- × Quesmea 'QA-1'
