= Calliaspis limbaticollis =

Scientific classification
- Kingdom: Animalia
- Phylum: Arthropoda
- Clade: Pancrustacea
- Class: Insecta
- Order: Coleoptera
- Suborder: Polyphaga
- Infraorder: Cucujiformia
- Family: Chrysomelidae
- Genus: Calliaspis
- Species: C. limbaticollis

Binomial name
- Calliaspis limbaticollis Spaeth, 1932

Species of beetle

Calliaspis limbaticollis is a species of beetle of the family Chrysomelidae. It is found in Brazil (Amazonas).

== Biology ==
The food plant is unknown.
