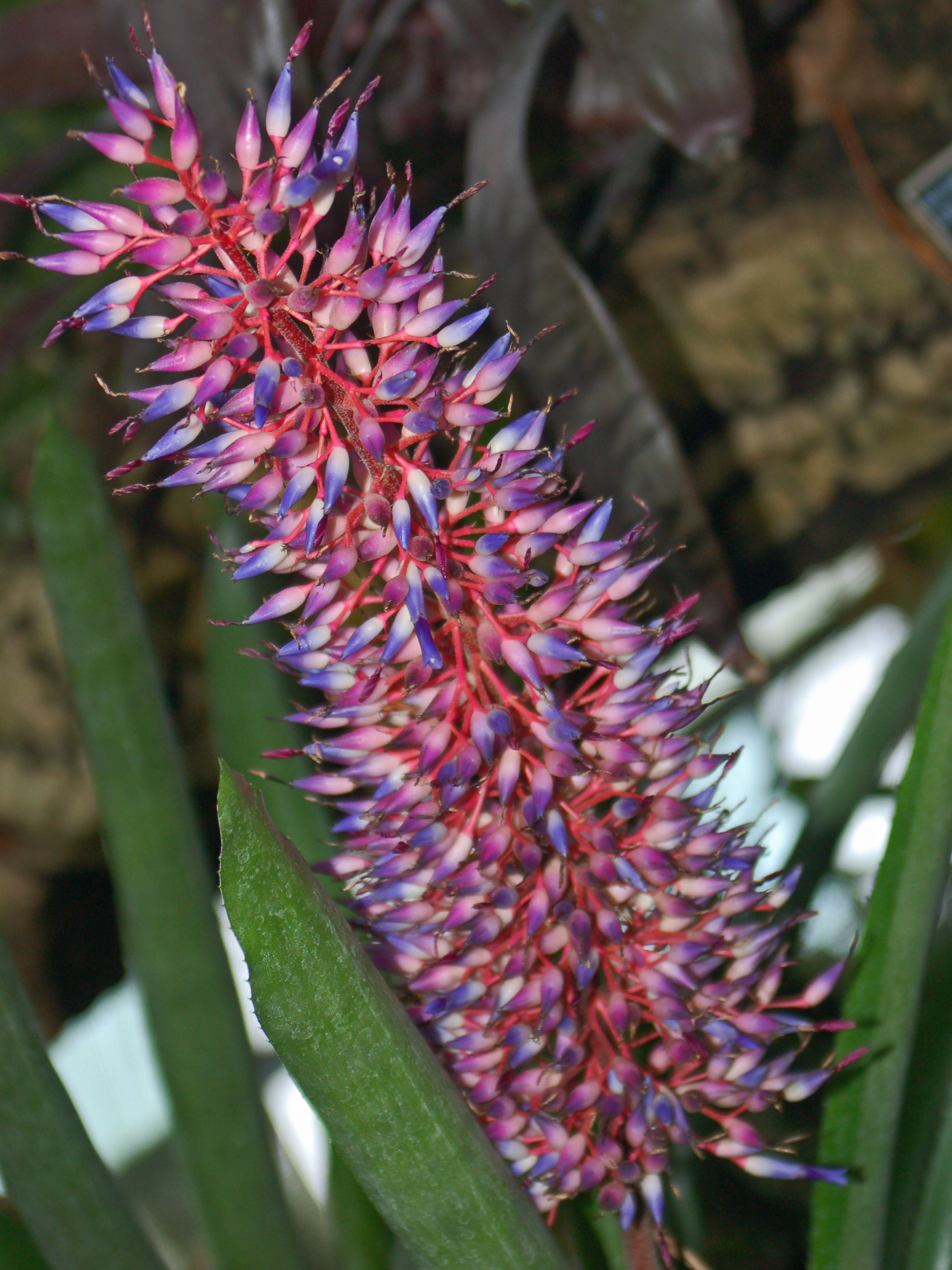
- Inflorescence of Aechmea fendleri

Scientific classification
- Kingdom: Plantae
- Clade: Embryophytes
- Clade: Tracheophytes
- Clade: Spermatophytes
- Clade: Angiosperms
- Clade: Monocots
- Clade: Commelinids
- Order: Poales
- Family: Bromeliaceae
- Genus: Aechmea
- Subgenus: Aechmea subg. Aechmea
- Species: A. fendleri

Binomial name
- Aechmea fendleri André ex Mez

Synonyms
- Heterotypic Synonyms: Aechmea paniculigera Griseb.; Aechmea porteoides Britton

= Aechmea fendleri =

Species of flowering plant

Aechmea fendleri is a species of flowering plant in the bromeliad family, Bromeliaceae. This species is native to Venezuela and Trinidad and Tobago.

== Cultivars ==
The species is widely cultivated as an ornamental. Cultivars include:

- Aechmea 'Blue Tango'
- Aechmea 'Flamingo'
- Aechmea 'Foster's Freckles'
- Aechmea 'Lilac Cloud'
- Aechmea 'Pink Rocket'
- Aechmea 'Purple Velvet'
- Aechmea 'Romero'
- Aechmea 'Royanne'
- Aechmea 'Shelldancer'
- Aechmea 'Spring Beauty'
- × Canmea 'Carmin'
- × Ursumea 'Ma Williams'

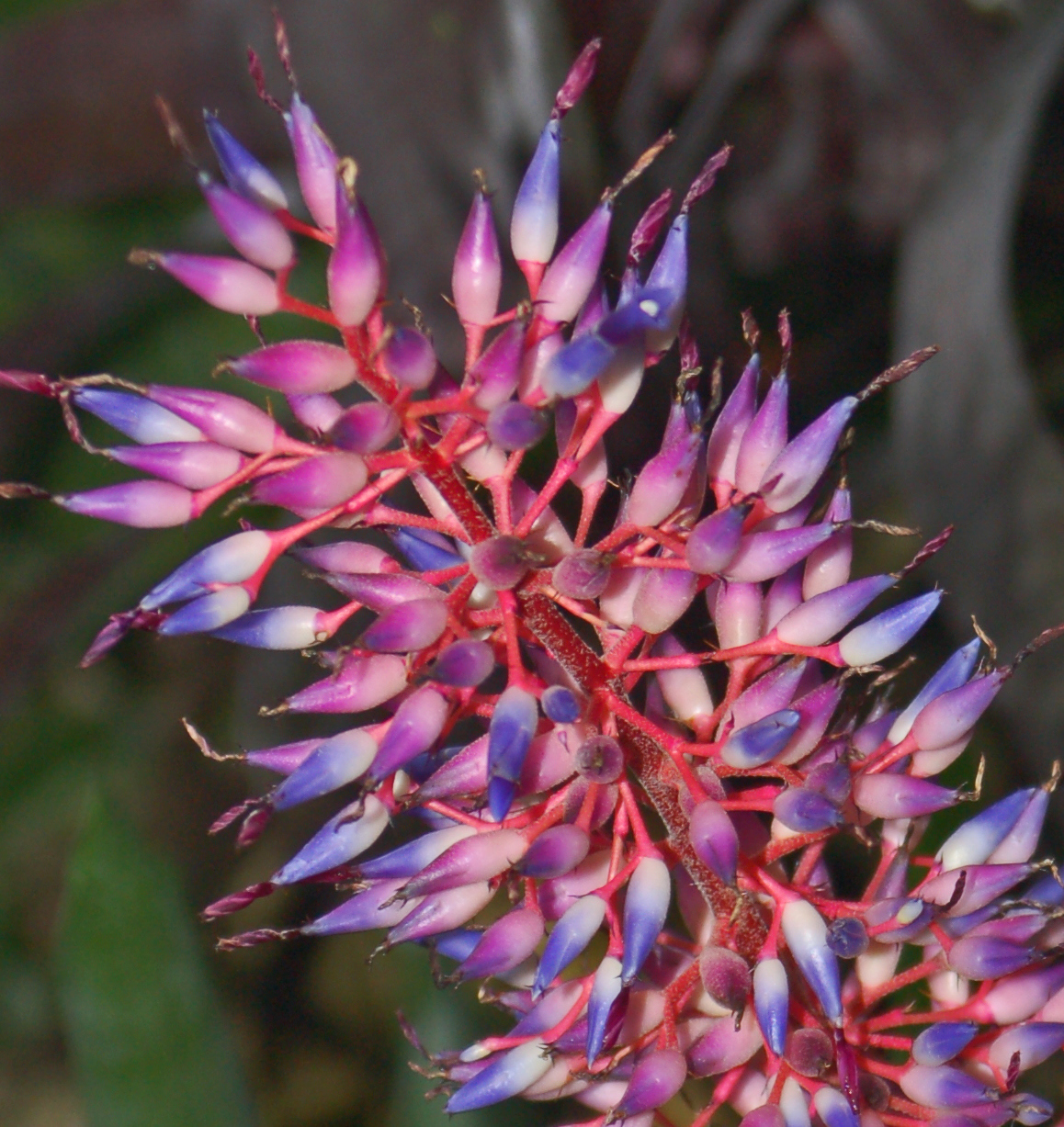
Close-up of flowers
