= Aechmea aripoensis =

Scientific classification
- Kingdom: Plantae
- Clade: Tracheophytes
- Clade: Angiosperms
- Clade: Monocots
- Clade: Commelinids
- Order: Poales
- Family: Bromeliaceae
- Genus: Aechmea
- Subgenus: Aechmea subg. Aechmea
- Species: A. aripoensis

Binomial name
- Aechmea aripoensis (N.E.Br.) Pittendrigh

Synonyms
- Gravisia aripoensis N.E.Br.

Species of flowering plant

Aechmea aripoensis is a species of bromeliad native to Venezuela and Trinidad.

== Cultivars ==
- Aechmea 'Raspberry'
