= Calliaspis discophora =

Scientific classification
- Kingdom: Animalia
- Phylum: Arthropoda
- Clade: Pancrustacea
- Class: Insecta
- Order: Coleoptera
- Suborder: Polyphaga
- Infraorder: Cucujiformia
- Family: Chrysomelidae
- Genus: Calliaspis
- Species: C. discophora

Binomial name
- Calliaspis discophora Boheman, 1850

Species of beetle

Calliaspis discophora is a species of beetle of the family Chrysomelidae. It is found in French Guiana.

== Biology ==
The food plant is unknown.
