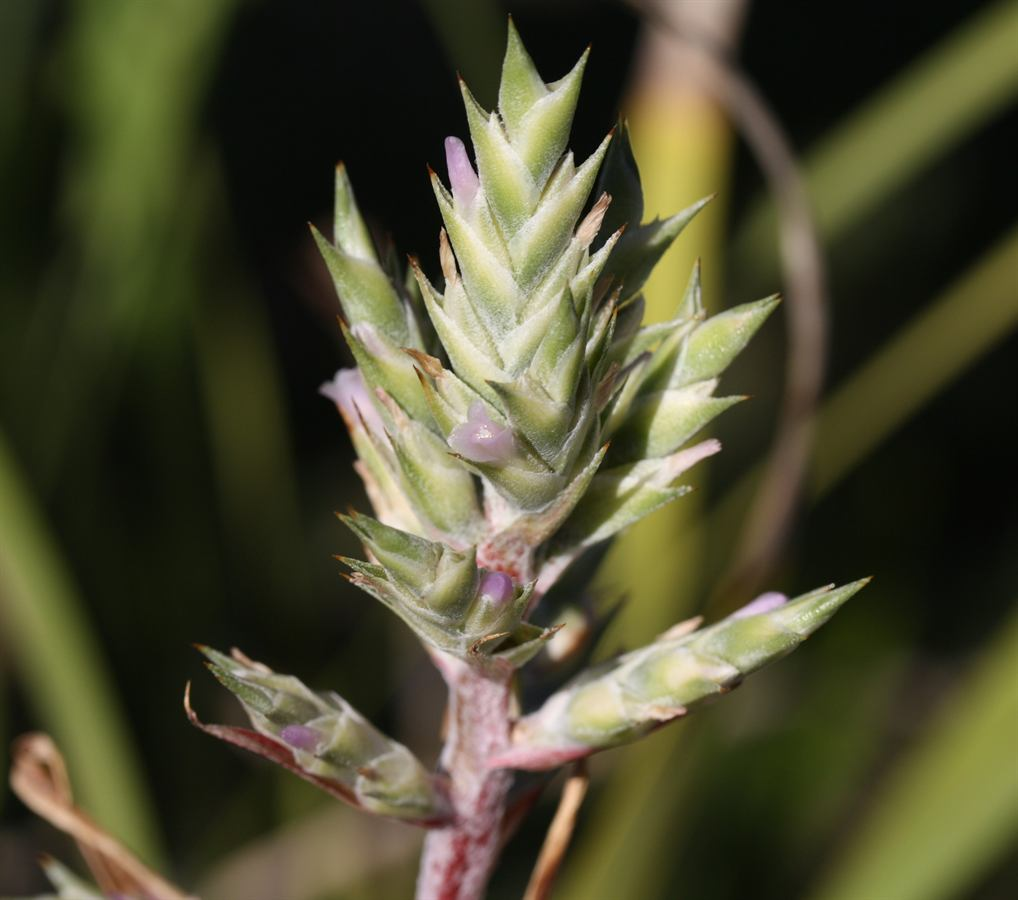

Scientific classification
- Kingdom: Plantae
- Clade: Tracheophytes
- Clade: Angiosperms
- Clade: Monocots
- Clade: Commelinids
- Order: Poales
- Family: Bromeliaceae
- Genus: Aechmea
- Subgenus: Aechmea subg. Aechmea
- Species: A. pubescens

Binomial name
- Aechmea pubescens Baker

Synonyms
- Aechmea standleyi Cufod.

= Aechmea pubescens =

Species of flowering plant

Aechmea pubescens is a species of flowering plant in the Bromeliaceae family. This species is native to Costa Rica, Honduras, Nicaragua, Panama, Colombia and Venezuela.
