= Aechmea fasciata =

Scientific classification
- Kingdom: Plantae
- Clade: Tracheophytes
- Clade: Angiosperms
- Clade: Monocots
- Clade: Commelinids
- Order: Poales
- Family: Bromeliaceae
- Genus: Aechmea
- Subgenus: Aechmea subg. Aechmea
- Species: A. fasciata

Binomial name
- Aechmea fasciata (Lindl.) Baker

Synonyms
- Aechmea fasciata var. flavivittata Reitz; Aechmea fasciata var. pruinosa Reitz; Aechmea fasciata var. purpurea (Guillon) Mez; Aechmea hamata Mez; Aechmea leopoldii Baker; Billbergia fasciata Lindl. Billbergia glazioviana Regel; Billbergia rhodocyanea Lem. Billbergia rhodocyanea var. purpurea Guillon; Hohenbergia fasciata (Lindl.) Schult. & Schult.f. Hoplophytum fasciatum (Lindl.) Beer; Platyaechmea fasciata (Lindl.) L.B.Sm. & W.J.Kress; Tillandsia bracteata Vell.

Species of plant

Aechmea fasciata is a species of flowering plant in the Bromeliaceae family. It is commonly called the silver vase or urn plant and is native to Brazil. This plant is probably the best known species in this genus, and it is often grown as a houseplant in temperate areas.

== Description ==
The plant grows slowly, reaching 30–90 cm (12–35 in) in height, with a spread of up to 60 cm (24 in). It has elliptic–oval-shaped leaves 45–90 cm (18–35 in) long and arranged in a basal rosette pattern. The robust leaves have armored edges (like all members of the Bromelioideae). The leaf sheath is 9–10 cm (4–4 in) wide. The 6 cm (2 in) wide leaf blade is rounded at the end, but with a 4 mm long spine tip. Large amounts of water often collect in the leaf funnels.

In their natural habitat, many of the funnels contain small biotopes with several animal species, as well as algae and aquatic plants. The leaves have whitish sucking scales (trichomes) on the upper and lower surfaces. These are distributed differently depending on the variety: they can cover the entire surface, or there are transverse bands with or without scales, which results in an interesting leaf pattern. There are also varieties with yellowish longitudinal lines (variegation).

=== Inflorescence ===
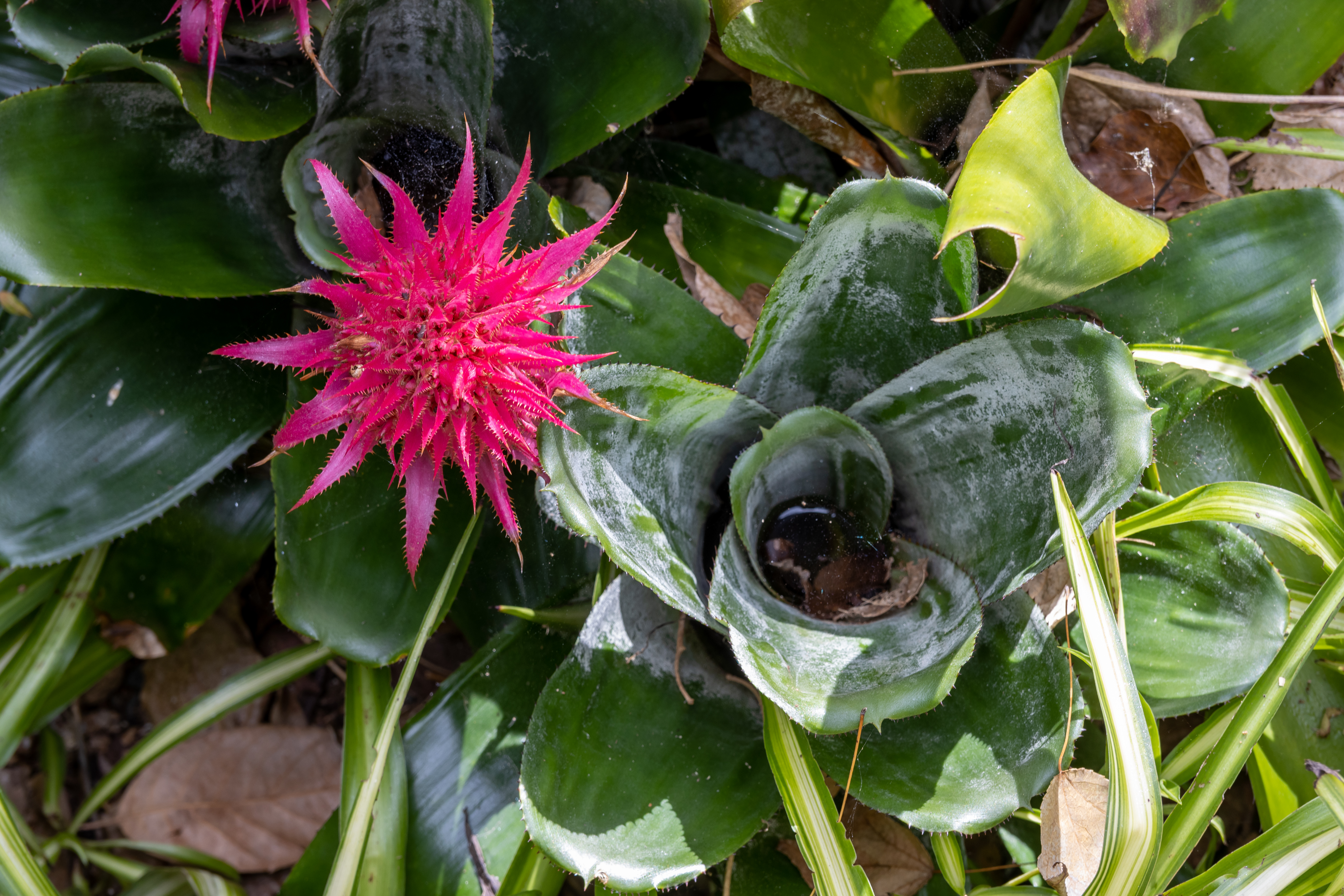
In flower

The inflorescence stem has a diameter of 1 cm and a length of 30–40 cm (12–16 in). The long-lasting, capitate-pyramidal inflorescences, branched at the base and simple at the apex, are composed of spike-like inflorescences. The inflorescences are borne on striking pink bracts with a spiny, toothed margin.

The sessile, hermaphroditic, three-petaled flowers are about 3.5 cm (1 in) long. The three asymmetrical, 1 cm (0 in) long sepals are fused into a short (2.5 mm) tube; they are pink, covered in white woolly scales and blunt at the end. The three 3 cm (1 in) long petals are fused into a short tube. Two small scales on the petals (ligules) form a characteristic that botanists use to distinguish them from other genera in the subfamily. The color of the petals is initially blue; as they wilt, they turn red at the top and white towards the base. There are two circles, each with three stamens. Three carpels are fused into an inferior ovary, which is 5 to 6 mm in diameter and 6 to 8 mm long.

== Cultivation ==
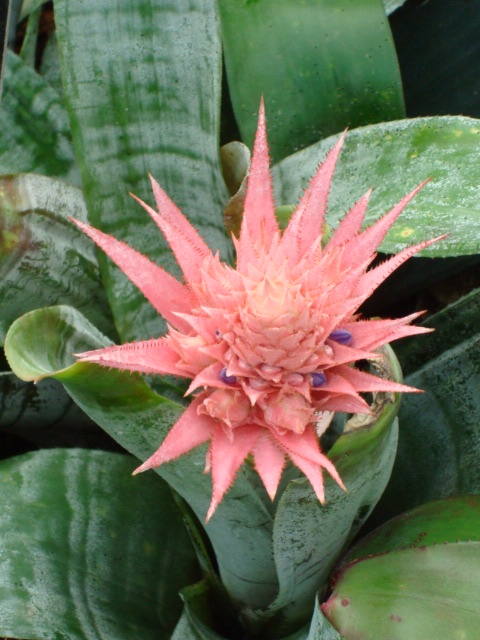
Flower close-up

Aechmea fasciata requires partial shade to bright indirect light, and can handle brief periods of early morning sunlight, but should be shielded from the sun during the hottest parts of the day. Excessive sun exposure will cause burning on the foliage and dehydration of the plant; comparatively, reduced sunlight or darker conditions will prevent the plant's characteristic coloration and striping from developing fully, instead reverting to a deeper hue of pastel-green/teal-blue in an effort to photosynthesize effectively in the shade. Less bright indirect light will also limit flowering. As with all bromeliads and epiphytes, Aechmea fasciata requires adequate airflow around the entire plant to stay fresh.

Over time, the plant’s roots will adhere to the surface provided, and the plant will form a small colony. The gardener simply keeps the "cup" or funnels filled with water. This method of cultivation is mostly executed successfully outdoors, rather than indoors, and is best-achieved in appropriate climates, especially maritime or seaside locations where the bromeliad may absorb moisture via fog and marine layer.

=== Growth media ===
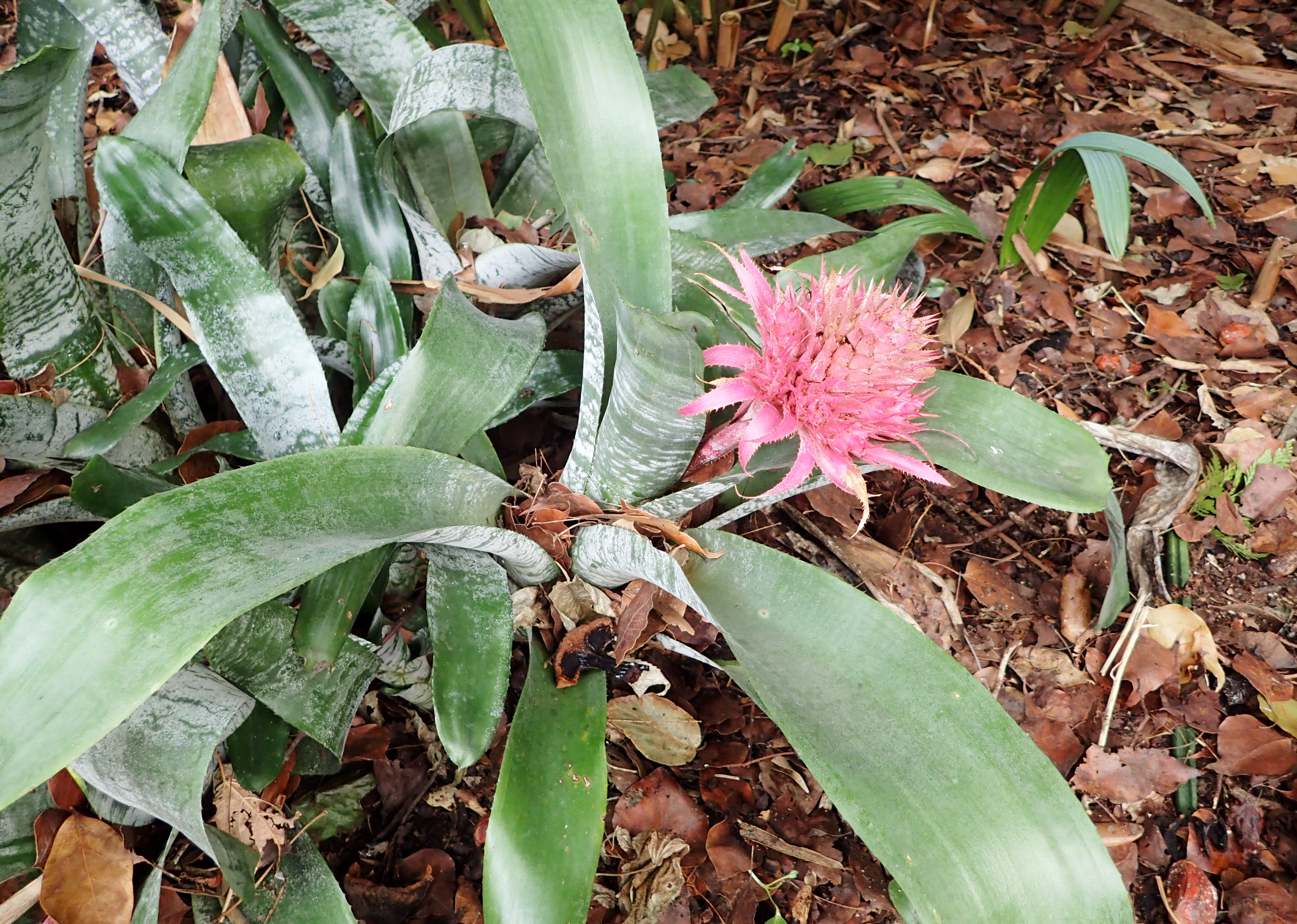
Growing in clumps in natural mulch

A well-drained, but moisture-retentive soil, is recommended, including prepared orchid or cactus and succulent soil mixes. It is often recommended for gardeners to add additional inert materials, such as pumice, perlite, lava rock, or vermiculite, as well as optional chunks of orchid bark or coconut chips/husks. Root rot can be a problem in potted indoor plants, if the soil is too moist or does not contain enough inert drainage material.

Potted bromeliads, alternatively, will thrive in a medium of pure sphagnum moss, as this substrate absorbs water effectively while remaining porous enough to dry and let the roots breathe. The rosette "cups", formed by the leaves, should be kept filled with water, although adequate evaporation is necessary to prevent crown rot in indoor specimens.

Bromeliads can also be grown epiphytically, or mounted, with dried sphagnum moss tied around their roots, with the entire plant then tied (with string or wire) to a board, cork bark, driftwood, or even a living tree branch, among other choices. The plants may also be attached using superglue, hot glue, or silicone sealant (preferably labeled as pond- and fish-safe, which is commonly used with plants).

=== Propagation ===
Propagation is from side-shoots ("pups") that naturally develop around the base of the main rosette. A sharp, alcohol-sterilized knife may be used to remove plantlets that have grown to several inches in height, cutting as close to the base as possible to retain any young roots that have formed. Removal of pups that are too small or underdeveloped often simply results in their desiccation and death.

=== Pests ===
Scale insects may be attracted to the tight spaces between leaves, and mosquitos will sometimes (though rarely) breed in the pools of water that are accumulated in the plant—in outdoor specimens, specifically. Hence, regular flushing with water is recommended if rain does not regularly occur.

== Toxicity ==
Aechmea fasciata, while not lethally poisonous, is listed in the FDA Poisonous Plant Database under the section "skin-irritating substances in plants". As bromeliads naturally produce the enzyme and alkaloid bromelain—commonly extracted from pineapples (also a bromeliad) as a supplement and digestive enzyme—, skin contact with the plant's sharp, serrated leaf margins is known to cause contact dermititis, phytophotodermatitis, and contact allergy; typical side effects are a mild, itchy sensation or redness. Therefore leather gloves are recommended when working with bromeliads, for example, arm-length or rose-pruning gloves.

== Cultivars ==
- Aechmea 'Aton'
- Aechmea 'Auslese'
- Aechmea 'Chantata'
- Aechmea 'Charles Hodgson'
- Aechmea 'Checkers'
- Aechmea 'Club Maurice'
- Aechmea 'Cosmic Starburst'
- Aechmea 'DeLeon'
- Aechmea 'Dennis B.'
- Aechmea 'Donna Marie'
- Aechmea 'Fascidata'
- Aechmea 'Fascini'
- Aechmea 'Friederike'
- Aechmea 'Frost'
- Aechmea 'Fulgo-Fasciata'
- Aechmea 'Henrietta'
- Aechmea 'Ivory'
- Aechmea 'Julie Sewell'
- Aechmea 'Kiwi'
- Aechmea 'Leucadia'
- Aechmea 'Margarita L.'
- Aechmea 'Mona'
- Aechmea 'Morgana'
- Aechmea 'Pink Fantasy'
- Aechmea 'Pink Rocket'
- Aechmea 'Primera'
- Aechmea 'Purple Velvet'
- Aechmea 'Red Rocket'
- Aechmea 'Silver King'
- Aechmea 'Silver Queen'
- Aechmea 'Silver Sister'
- Aechmea 'Smoothie'
- Aechmea 'Starbrite'
- Aechmea 'White Head'
- × Androlaechmea 'Crateriformis'
- × Billmea 'Rangitoto'
- × Canmea 'Wild Tiger'
- × Neomea 'Fascidorffii'
- × Neomea 'Pink Cascade'
- × Nidumea 'Angellina'
- × Nidumea 'Midnight'
- × Nidumea 'Superstar'
- × Quesmea 'Facsimile'
