= Calliaspis wegrzynowiczi =

Scientific classification
- Kingdom: Animalia
- Phylum: Arthropoda
- Clade: Pancrustacea
- Class: Insecta
- Order: Coleoptera
- Suborder: Polyphaga
- Infraorder: Cucujiformia
- Family: Chrysomelidae
- Genus: Calliaspis
- Species: C. wegrzynowiczi

Binomial name
- Calliaspis wegrzynowiczi Borowiec & Stojczew, 1998

Species of beetle

Calliaspis wegrzynowiczi is a species of beetle of the family Chrysomelidae. It is found in Ecuador.

== Description ==
Adults reach a length of about 5.3 mm. Adults have a uniformly purple red pronotal and elytral disc.

== Biology ==
The food plant is unknown.
