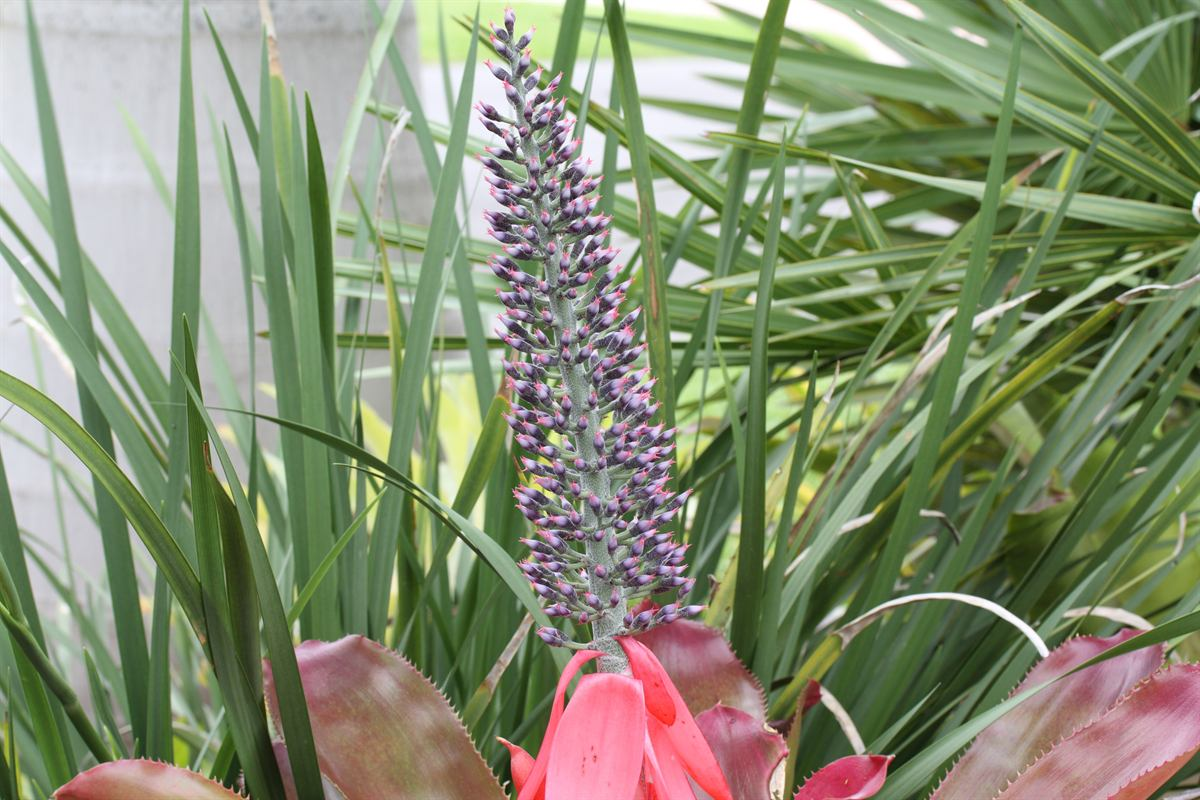

Scientific classification
- Kingdom: Plantae
- Clade: Tracheophytes
- Clade: Angiosperms
- Clade: Monocots
- Clade: Commelinids
- Order: Poales
- Family: Bromeliaceae
- Genus: Aechmea
- Subgenus: Aechmea subg. Aechmea
- Species: A. paniculigera

Binomial name
- Aechmea paniculigera (Swartz) Grisebach

Synonyms
- Bromelia paniculigera Sw.; Hohenbergia paniculigera (Sw.) Baker; Bromelia paniculata J.F.Gmel.; Bromelia latifolia Willd. ex Schult. & Schult.f.; Aechmea columnaris André; Aechmea latifolia (Willd. ex Schult. & Schult.f.) Klotzsch ex Baker; Aechmea chromatica C.H.Wright

= Aechmea paniculigera =

Species of flowering plant

Aechmea paniculigera is a plant species in the genus Aechmea. It grows in Colombia, Venezuela and Jamaica.

== Description ==
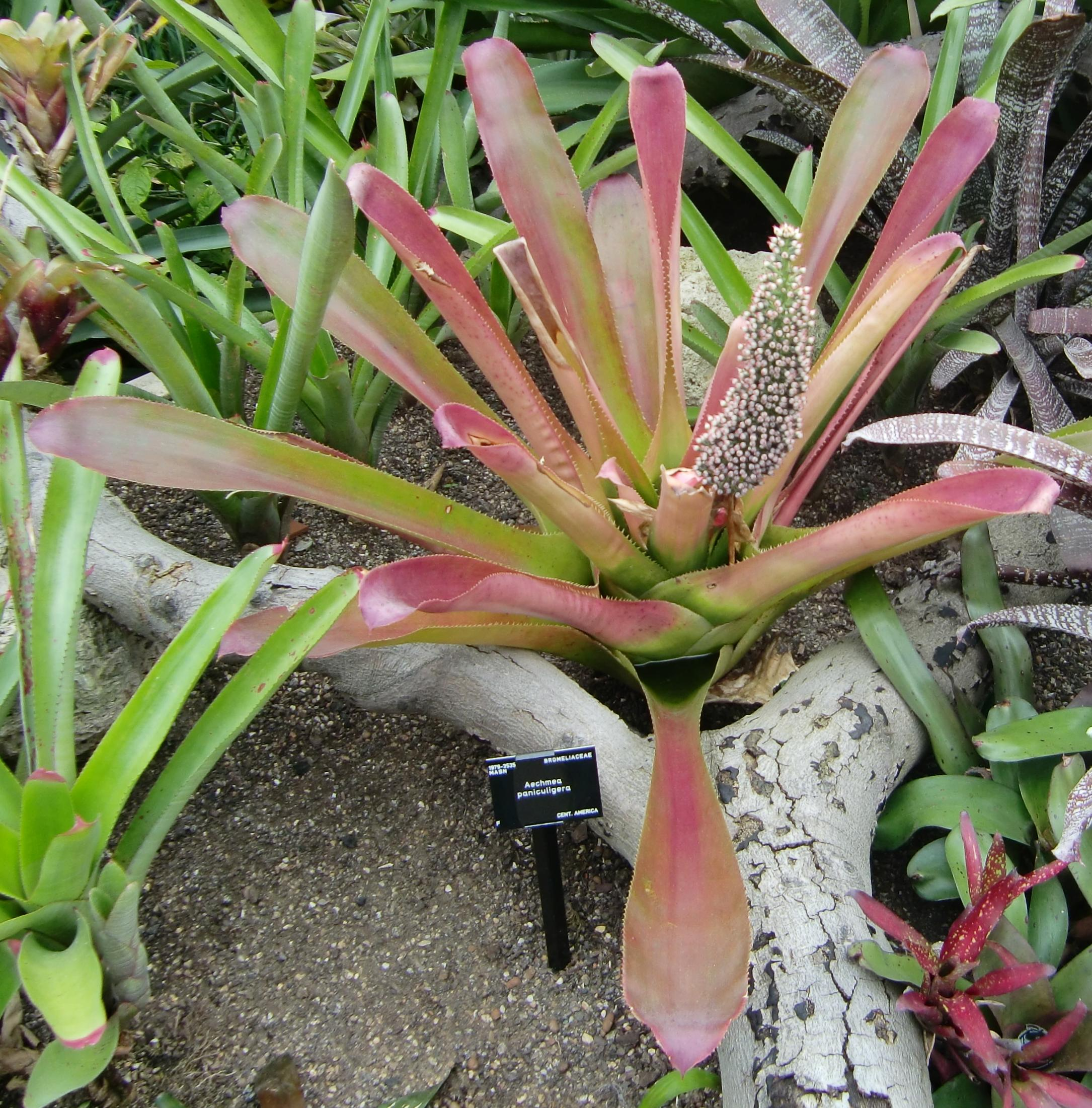
In flower, with a pool of water trapped at the base of the leaf

The pools of water trapped at the base of its leaves are home to various creatures including young bromeliad crabs and damselflies.

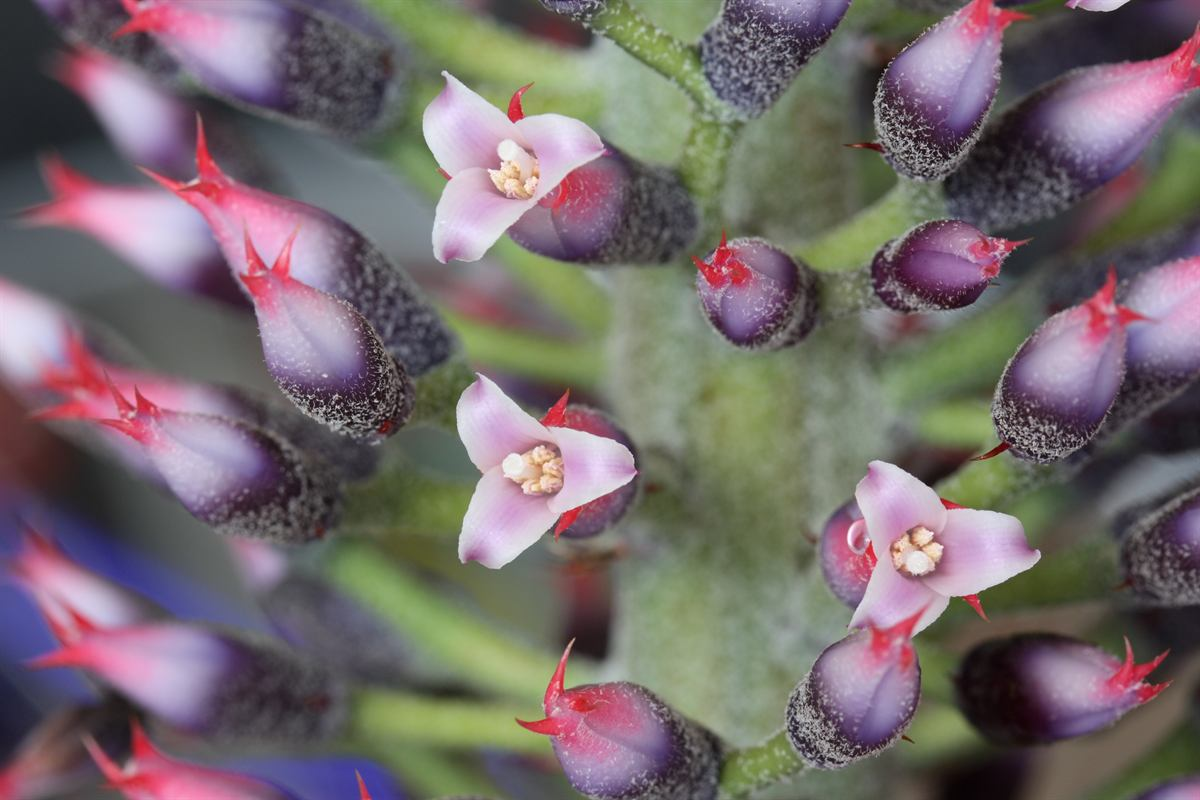
Open Flowers
