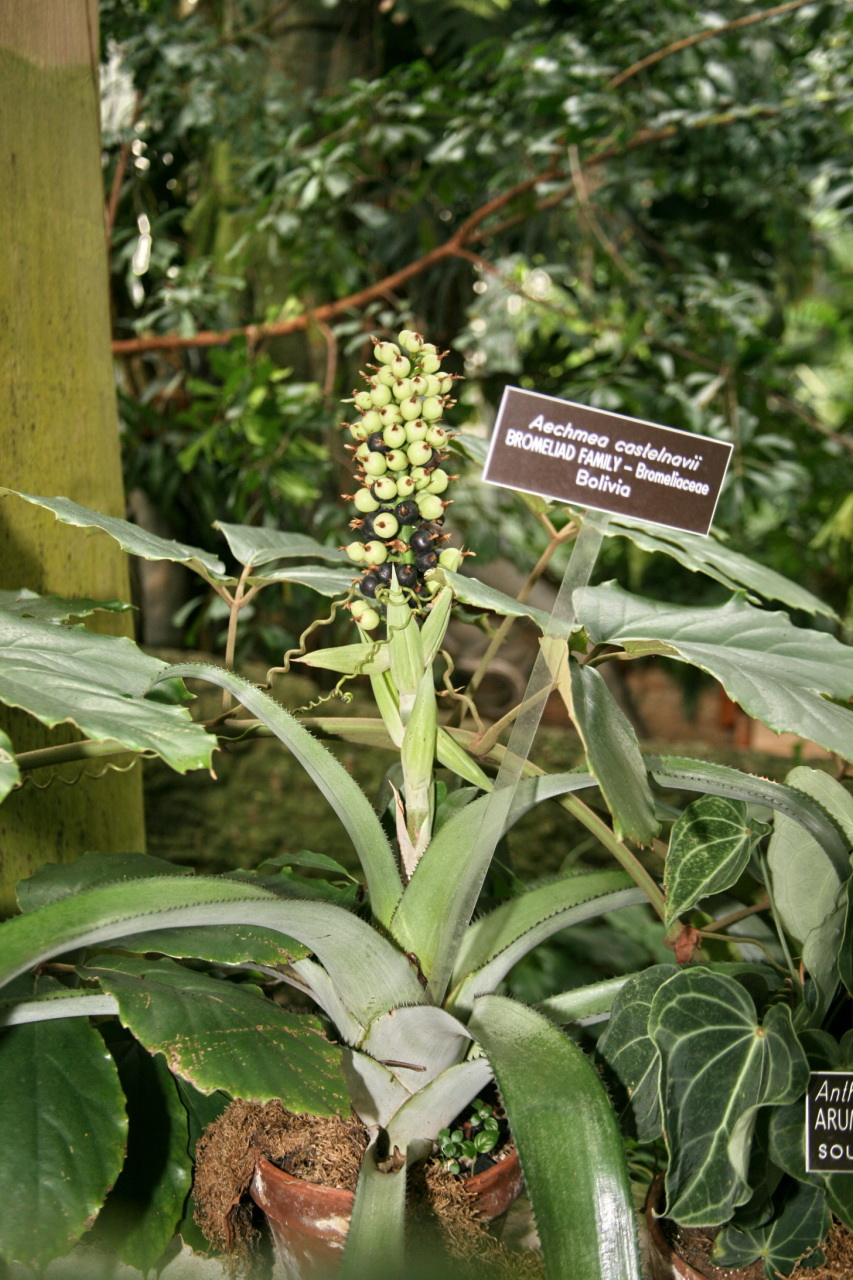

Scientific classification
- Kingdom: Plantae
- Clade: Tracheophytes
- Clade: Angiosperms
- Clade: Monocots
- Clade: Commelinids
- Order: Poales
- Family: Bromeliaceae
- Genus: Aechmea
- Subgenus: Aechmea subg. Aechmea
- Species: A. castelnavii

Binomial name
- Aechmea castelnavii Baker

Synonyms
- Aechmea sprucei Mez

= Aechmea castelnavii =

Species of flowering plant

Aechmea castelnavii is a plant species in the genus Aechmea. This species is native to Costa Rica and northern South America (Bolivia, Venezuela, Colombia, Peru and Brazil).

== Cultivars ==
- × Neomea 'Barbara Ruskin'
