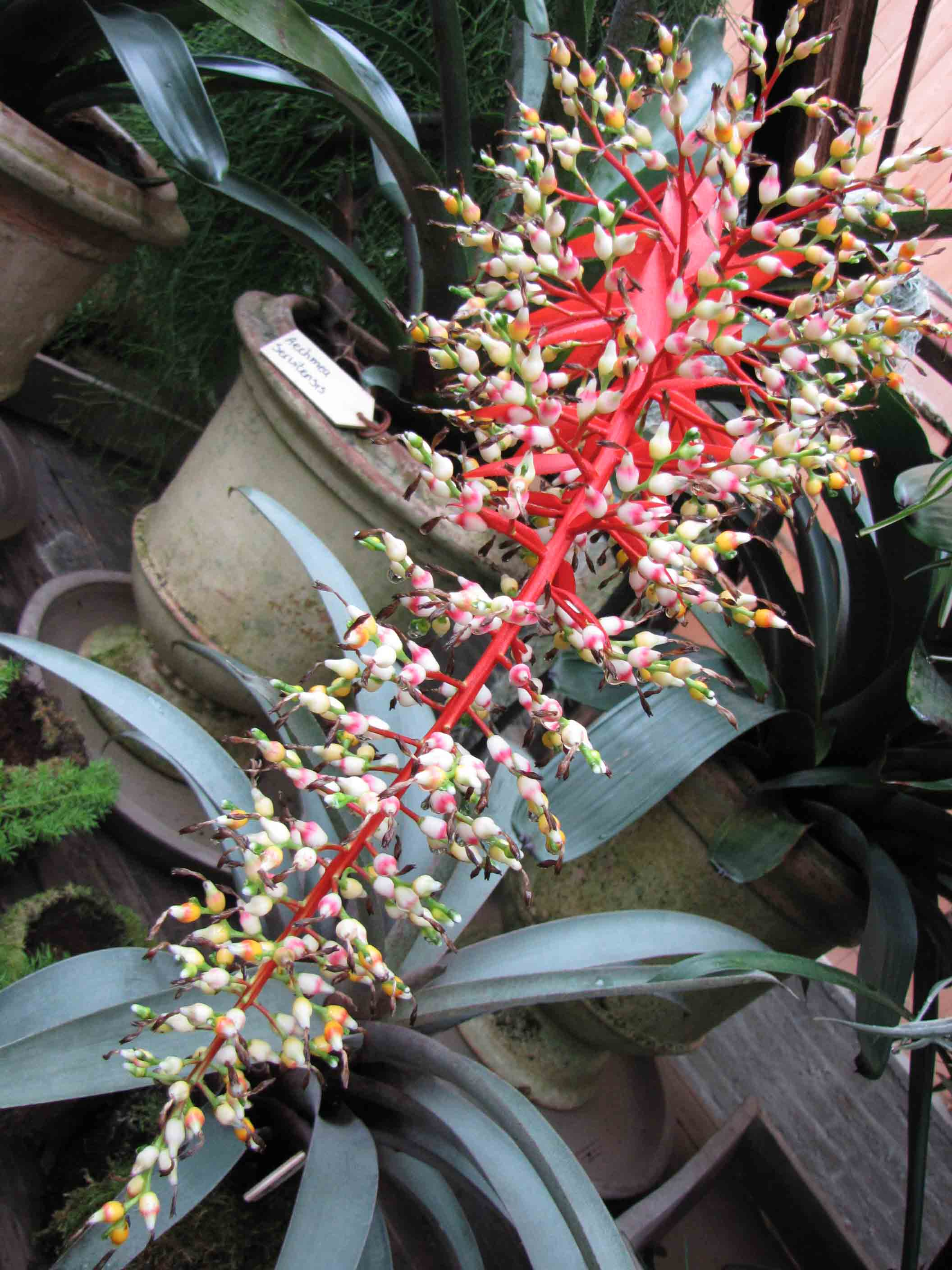

Scientific classification
- Kingdom: Plantae
- Clade: Tracheophytes
- Clade: Angiosperms
- Clade: Monocots
- Clade: Commelinids
- Order: Poales
- Family: Bromeliaceae
- Genus: Aechmea
- Subgenus: Aechmea subg. Aechmea
- Species: A. servitensis

Binomial name
- Aechmea servitensis André

= Aechmea servitensis =

Species of plant

Aechmea servitensis is a species of flowering plant in the Bromeliaceae family. It is native to Ecuador and Colombia.
