= Calliaspis andicola =

Scientific classification
- Kingdom: Animalia
- Phylum: Arthropoda
- Clade: Pancrustacea
- Class: Insecta
- Order: Coleoptera
- Suborder: Polyphaga
- Infraorder: Cucujiformia
- Family: Chrysomelidae
- Genus: Calliaspis
- Species: C. andicola

Binomial name
- Calliaspis andicola Spaeth, 1905

Species of beetle

Calliaspis andicola is a species of beetle of the family Chrysomelidae. It is found in Bolivia and Peru.

== Description ==
Adults have a black prosternum black and the elytra are without a yellow margin.

== Biology ==
The food plant is unknown.
