= Calliaspis testaceicornis =

Scientific classification
- Kingdom: Animalia
- Phylum: Arthropoda
- Clade: Pancrustacea
- Class: Insecta
- Order: Coleoptera
- Suborder: Polyphaga
- Infraorder: Cucujiformia
- Family: Chrysomelidae
- Genus: Calliaspis
- Species: C. testaceicornis

Binomial name
- Calliaspis testaceicornis (Weise, 1904)

Synonyms
- Cyanaspis testaceicornis Weise, 1904

Species of beetle

Calliaspis testaceicornis is a species of beetle of the family Chrysomelidae. It is found in Bolivia.

== Biology ==
The food plant is unknown.
