= Calliaspis surinamensis =

Scientific classification
- Kingdom: Animalia
- Phylum: Arthropoda
- Clade: Pancrustacea
- Class: Insecta
- Order: Coleoptera
- Suborder: Polyphaga
- Infraorder: Cucujiformia
- Family: Chrysomelidae
- Genus: Calliaspis
- Species: C. surinamensis

Binomial name
- Calliaspis surinamensis Borowiec, 2000

Species of beetle

Calliaspis surinamensis is a species of beetle of the family Chrysomelidae. It is found in Suriname.

== Description ==
Adults reach a length of about 5.5-6.1 mm. Adults have a bicoloured red and black pronotum and elytra.

== Biology ==
The food plant is unknown.

== Etymology ==
The species is named after the type location, Surinam in the northern part of South America.
