= Calliaspis bicolor =

Scientific classification
- Kingdom: Animalia
- Phylum: Arthropoda
- Clade: Pancrustacea
- Class: Insecta
- Order: Coleoptera
- Suborder: Polyphaga
- Infraorder: Cucujiformia
- Family: Chrysomelidae
- Genus: Calliaspis
- Species: C. bicolor

Binomial name
- Calliaspis bicolor Boheman, 1856

Species of beetle

Calliaspis bicolor is a species of beetle of the family Chrysomelidae. It is found in Bolivia and Brazil.

== Biology ==
The food plant is unknown.
