= Calliaspis =

Scientific classification
- Kingdom: Animalia
- Phylum: Arthropoda
- Clade: Pancrustacea
- Class: Insecta
- Order: Coleoptera
- Suborder: Polyphaga
- Infraorder: Cucujiformia
- Family: Chrysomelidae
- Subfamily: Cassidinae
- Tribe: Imatidiini
- Genus: Calliaspis; Dejean, 1836

Synonyms
- Cyanaspis Weise, 1904

Genus of leaf beetles

Calliaspis is a genus of beetles belonging to the family Chrysomelidae.

== Species ==
- Calliaspis andicola Spaeth, 1905
- Calliaspis bicolor Boheman, 1856
- Calliaspis bohemani Baly, 1859
- Calliaspis brevicornis Spaeth, 1905
- Calliaspis cerdai Borowiec, 2003
- Calliaspis cinnabarina Boheman, 1850
- Calliaspis coccinea Spaeth, 1915
- Calliaspis cyaneomicans Spaeth, 1953
- Calliaspis discophora Boheman, 1850
- Calliaspis funeraria Boheman, 1850
- Calliaspis limbaticollis Spaeth, 1932
- Calliaspis nimbata (Perty, 1834)
- Calliaspis rubra (Olivier, 1808)
- Calliaspis sachaensis Borowiec & Stojczew, 1998
- Calliaspis sahlbergi Spaeth, 1922
- Calliaspis substriata Spaeth, 1932
- Calliaspis surinamensis Borowiec, 2000
- Calliaspis testaceicornis (Weise, 1904)
- Calliaspis umbonata Hincks, 1956
- Calliaspis wegrzynowiczi Borowiec & Stojczew, 1998
