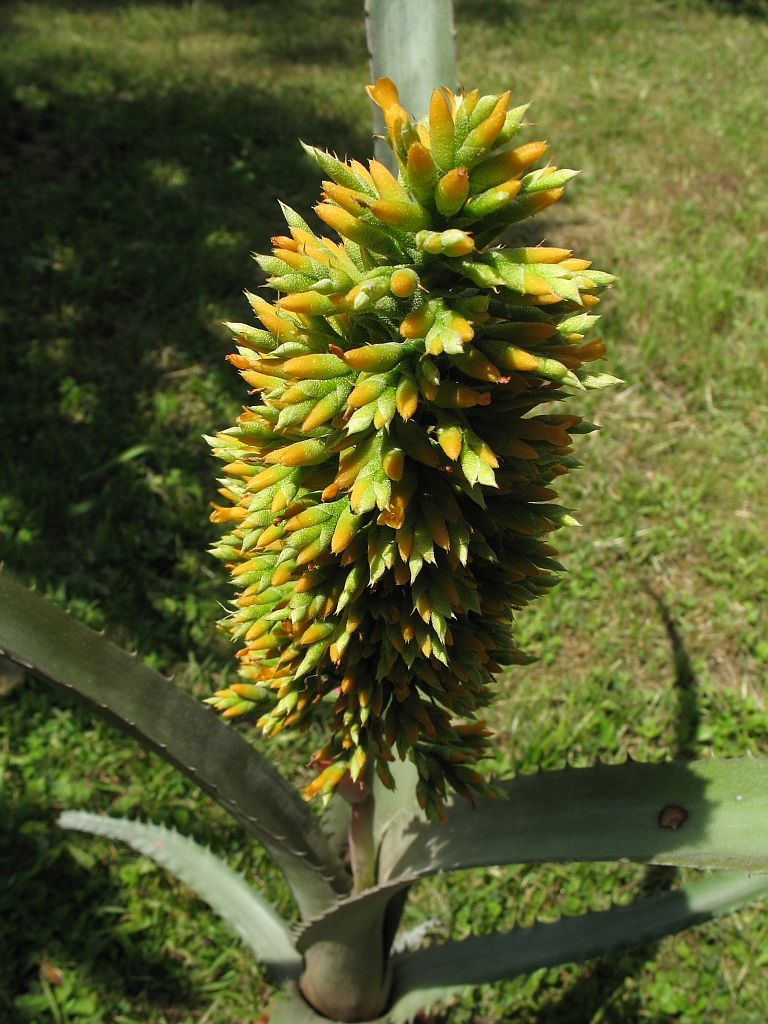
- Aechmea tocantina in cultivation at the Botanical Garden of the University of Heidelberg, Germany

Scientific classification
- Kingdom: Plantae
- Clade: Tracheophytes
- Clade: Angiosperms
- Clade: Monocots
- Clade: Commelinids
- Order: Poales
- Family: Bromeliaceae
- Genus: Aechmea
- Subgenus: Aechmea subg. Aechmea
- Species: A. tocantina

Binomial name
- Aechmea tocantina Baker

= Aechmea tocantina =

Species of flowering plant

Aechmea tocantina is a species of flowering plant in the Bromeliaceae family. This species is native to northern and central South America (Bolivia, Peru, Brazil, Colombia, Venezuela, the Guianas).
