= Aechmea cephaloides =

Scientific classification
- Kingdom: Plantae
- Clade: Tracheophytes
- Clade: Angiosperms
- Clade: Monocots
- Clade: Commelinids
- Order: Poales
- Family: Bromeliaceae
- Genus: Aechmea
- Subgenus: Aechmea subg. Aechmea
- Species: A. cephaloides

Binomial name
- Aechmea cephaloides J.A.Siqueira & Leme

Species of flowering plant

Aechmea cephaloides is a species of flowering plant in the genus Aechmea. This species is endemic to the State of Pernambuco in eastern Brazil.
