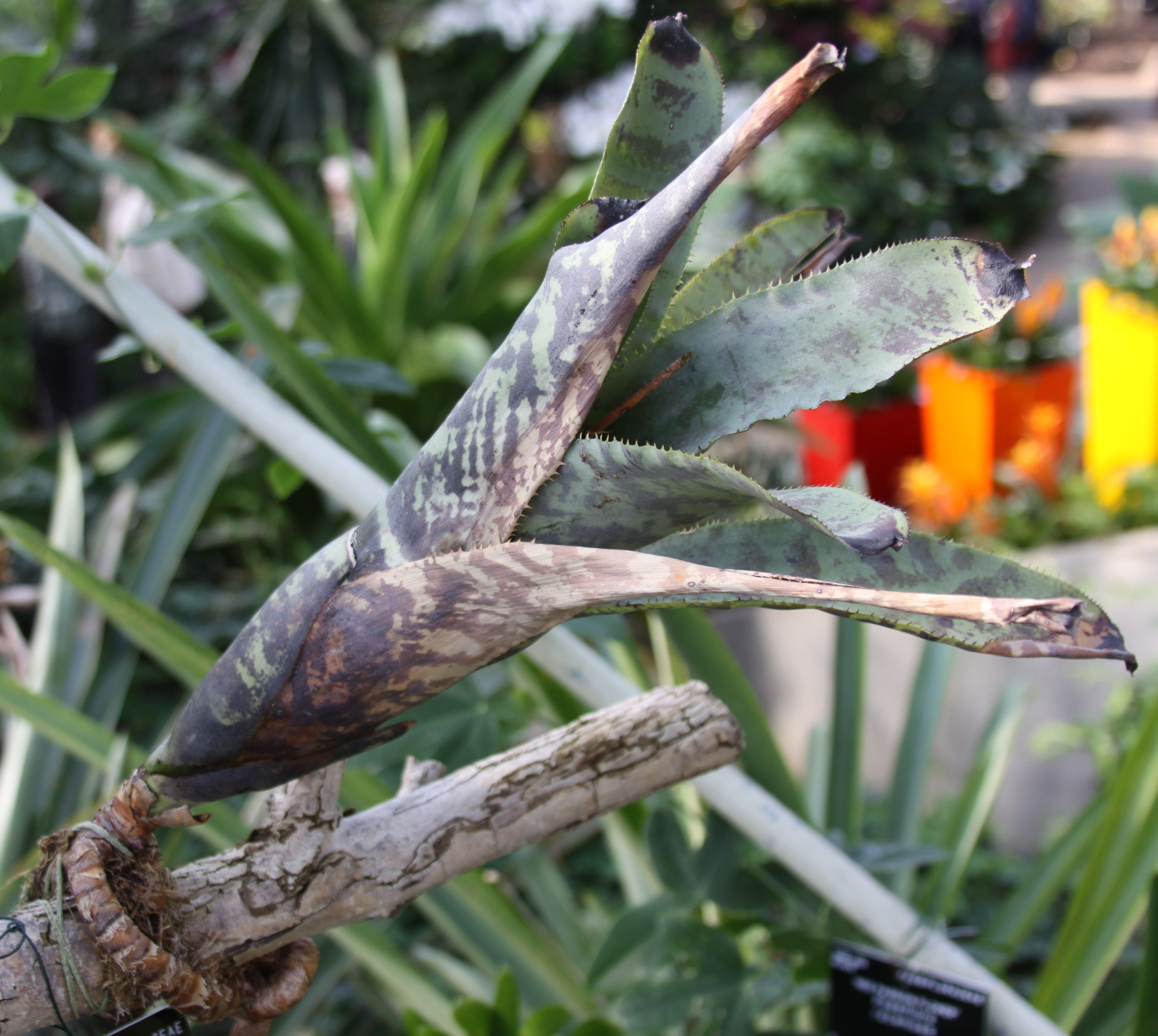

Scientific classification
- Kingdom: Plantae
- Clade: Tracheophytes
- Clade: Angiosperms
- Clade: Monocots
- Clade: Commelinids
- Order: Poales
- Family: Bromeliaceae
- Genus: Aechmea
- Subgenus: Aechmea subg. Aechmea
- Species: A. fosteriana

Binomial name
- Aechmea fosteriana L.B.Sm.

= Aechmea fosteriana =

Species of flowering plant

Aechmea fosteriana, the lacquered wine cup, is a bromeliad native to Brazil, which is endemic to coastal areas of the State of Espírito Santo. This plant is often grown as an ornamental plant.

The following subspecies are recognized :

- Aechmea fosteriana subsp. fosteriana L.B.Sm., 1941
- Aechmea fosteriana subsp. rupicola Leme, 1987

== Cultivars ==
- Aechmea 'Bert'
- Aechmea 'Chantifost'
- Aechmea 'Foster's Chant'
- Aechmea 'Kimberley'
- Aechmea 'Little Bert'
- × Canmea 'Majo'
