= Calliaspis umbonata =

Scientific classification
- Kingdom: Animalia
- Phylum: Arthropoda
- Clade: Pancrustacea
- Class: Insecta
- Order: Coleoptera
- Suborder: Polyphaga
- Infraorder: Cucujiformia
- Family: Chrysomelidae
- Genus: Calliaspis
- Species: C. umbonata

Binomial name
- Calliaspis umbonata Hincks, 1956

Synonyms
- Calliaspis cinnabarina umbonata Hincks, 1956

Species of beetle

Calliaspis umbonata is a species of beetle of the family Chrysomelidae. It is found in Brazil.

== Description ==
Adults reach a length of about 7.5–8 mm. The elytra are pale red with indistinct brownish spots.

== Biology ==
The food plant is unknown.
