= Aechmea costantinii =

Scientific classification
- Kingdom: Plantae
- Clade: Embryophytes
- Clade: Tracheophytes
- Clade: Spermatophytes
- Clade: Angiosperms
- Clade: Monocots
- Clade: Commelinids
- Order: Poales
- Family: Bromeliaceae
- Genus: Aechmea
- Subgenus: Aechmea subg. Aechmea
- Species: A. costantinii

Binomial name
- Aechmea costantinii (Mez) L.B.Sm.

Synonyms
- Homotypic Synonyms: Gravisia costantinii Mez; Heterotypic Synonyms: Aechmea megalantha Harms

Species of flowering plant

Aechmea costantinii is a species of flowering plant in the family Bromeliaceae. This species is endemic to northeastern Brazil.
