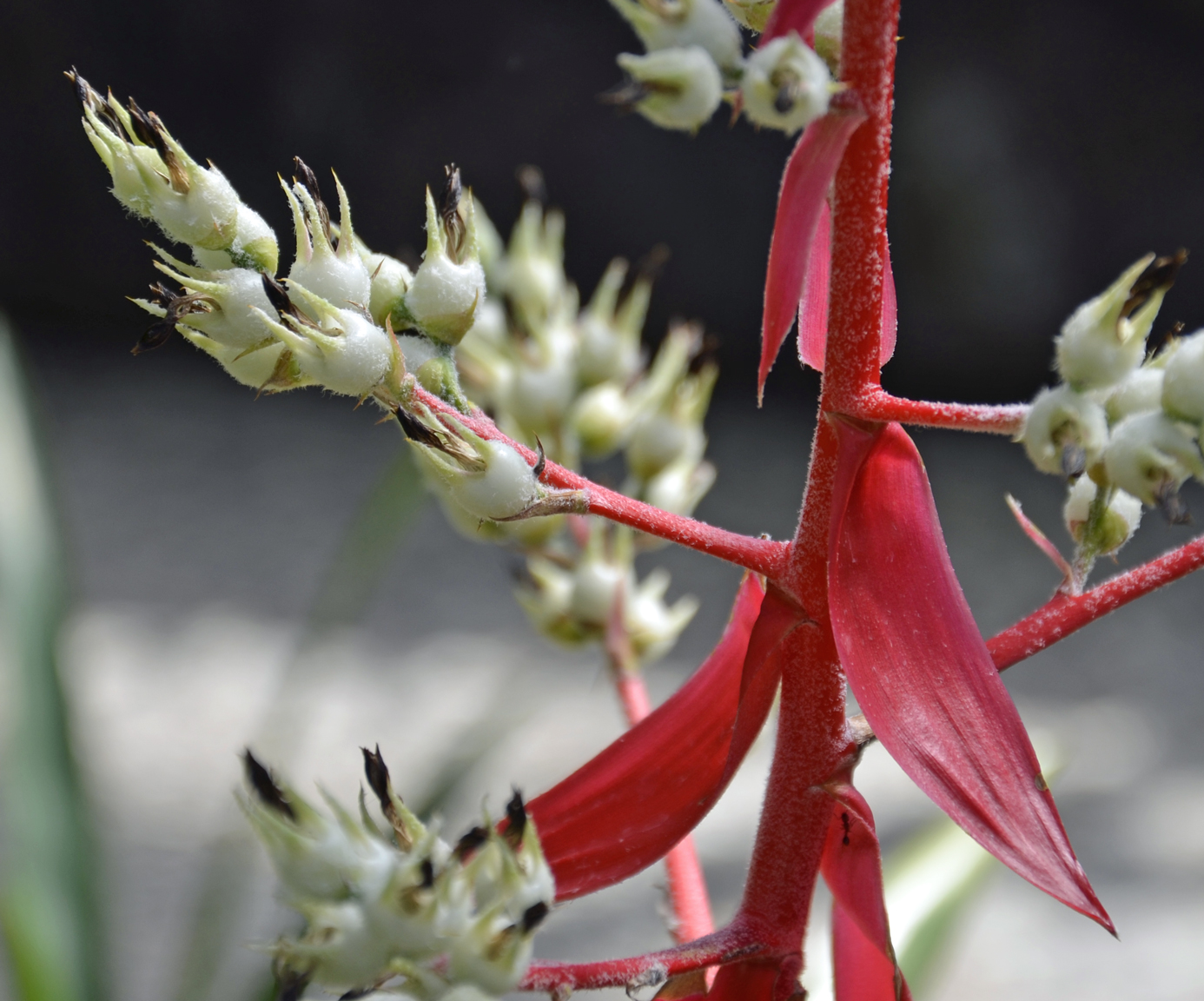

Scientific classification
- Kingdom: Plantae
- Clade: Tracheophytes
- Clade: Angiosperms
- Clade: Monocots
- Clade: Commelinids
- Order: Poales
- Family: Bromeliaceae
- Genus: Aechmea
- Subgenus: Aechmea subg. Aechmea
- Species: A. araneosa

Binomial name
- Aechmea araneosa L.B.Sm.

= Aechmea araneosa =

Species of flowering plant

Aechmea araneosa is a plant species of the genus Aechmea. This species is endemic to the State of Espírito Santo in Brazil. The plant ranges from 0-2 feet tall and 0-2 feet wide.

== Cultivars ==
- Aechmea 'Festival'
- Aechmea 'Orange Sunrise'
