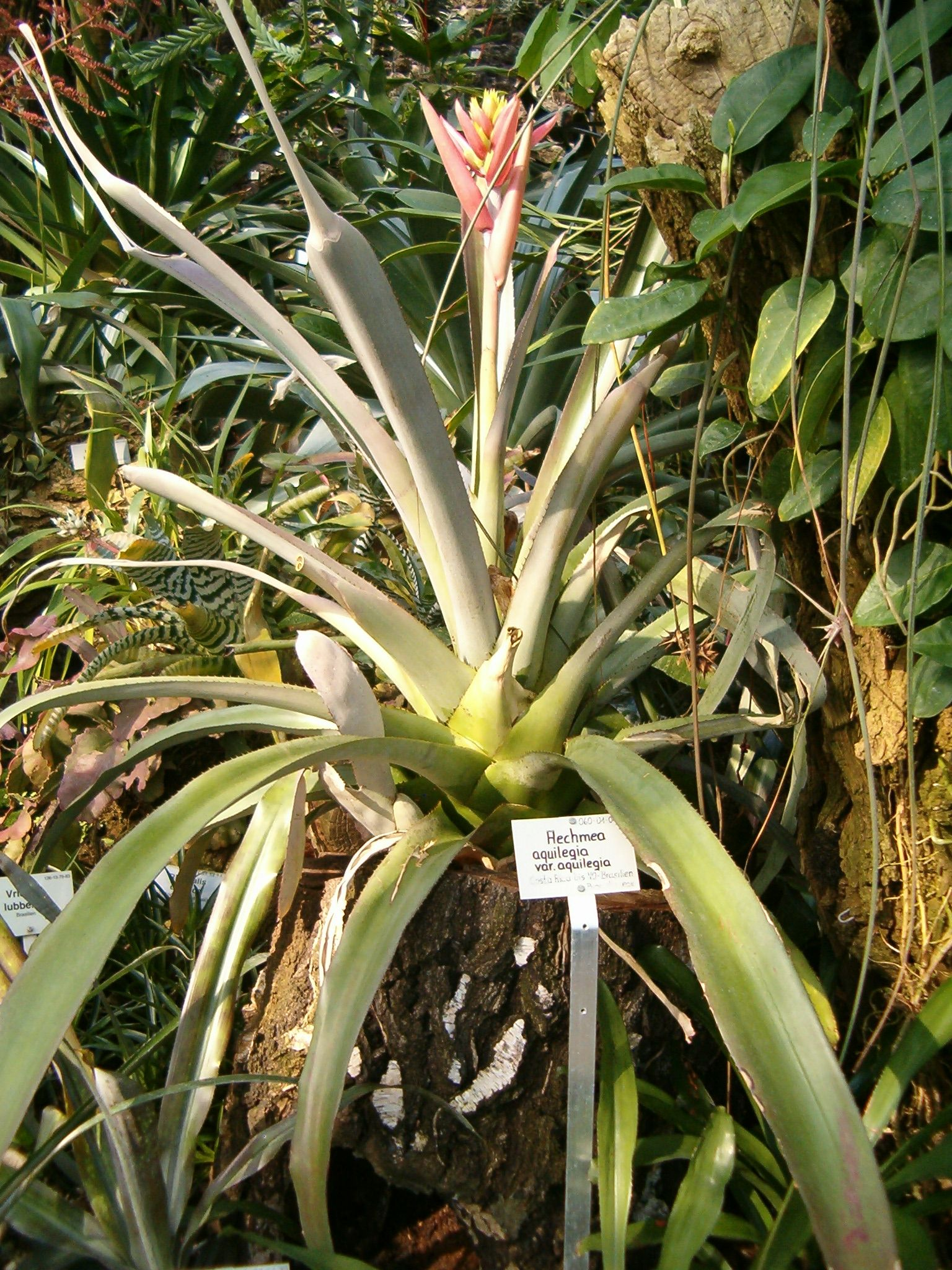

Scientific classification
- Kingdom: Plantae
- Clade: Tracheophytes
- Clade: Angiosperms
- Clade: Monocots
- Clade: Commelinids
- Order: Poales
- Family: Bromeliaceae
- Genus: Aechmea
- Subgenus: Aechmea subg. Aechmea
- Species: A. aquilega

Binomial name
- Aechmea aquilega (Salisb.) Griseb.

Synonyms
- Bromelia aquilega Salisb.; Bromelia bracteata var. aquilega (Salisb.) Steud.; Gravisia aquilega (Salisb.) Mez; Bromelia exsudans G.Lodd.; Tillandsia exsudans (G.Lodd.) Desf.; Bromelia paniculigera Rchb.; Bromelia surinamensis Miq.; Aechmea exsudans (G.Lodd.) E.Morren; Hohenbergia exsudans (G.Lodd.) E.Morren; Aechmea meyeri Baker; Aechmea aquilegioides Kuntze; Gravisia exsudans (G.Lodd.) Mez; Aechmea aquilega f. alba Oliva-Esteve

= Aechmea aquilega =

Species of flowering plant

Aechmea aquilega is a plant species in the genus Aechmea. This species is native to Brazil, Venezuela, the Guianas, Trinidad, Jamaica and Costa Rica.

== Infraspecifics ==
Varieties

- Aechmea aquilega var. chrysocoma (Baker) L.B.Sm.

Cultivars

- Aechmea 'Exotica Mystique'
- Aechmea 'Isabel D'Bellard'
- Aechmea 'Tropica'
- × Portemea 'Phat Pat'
