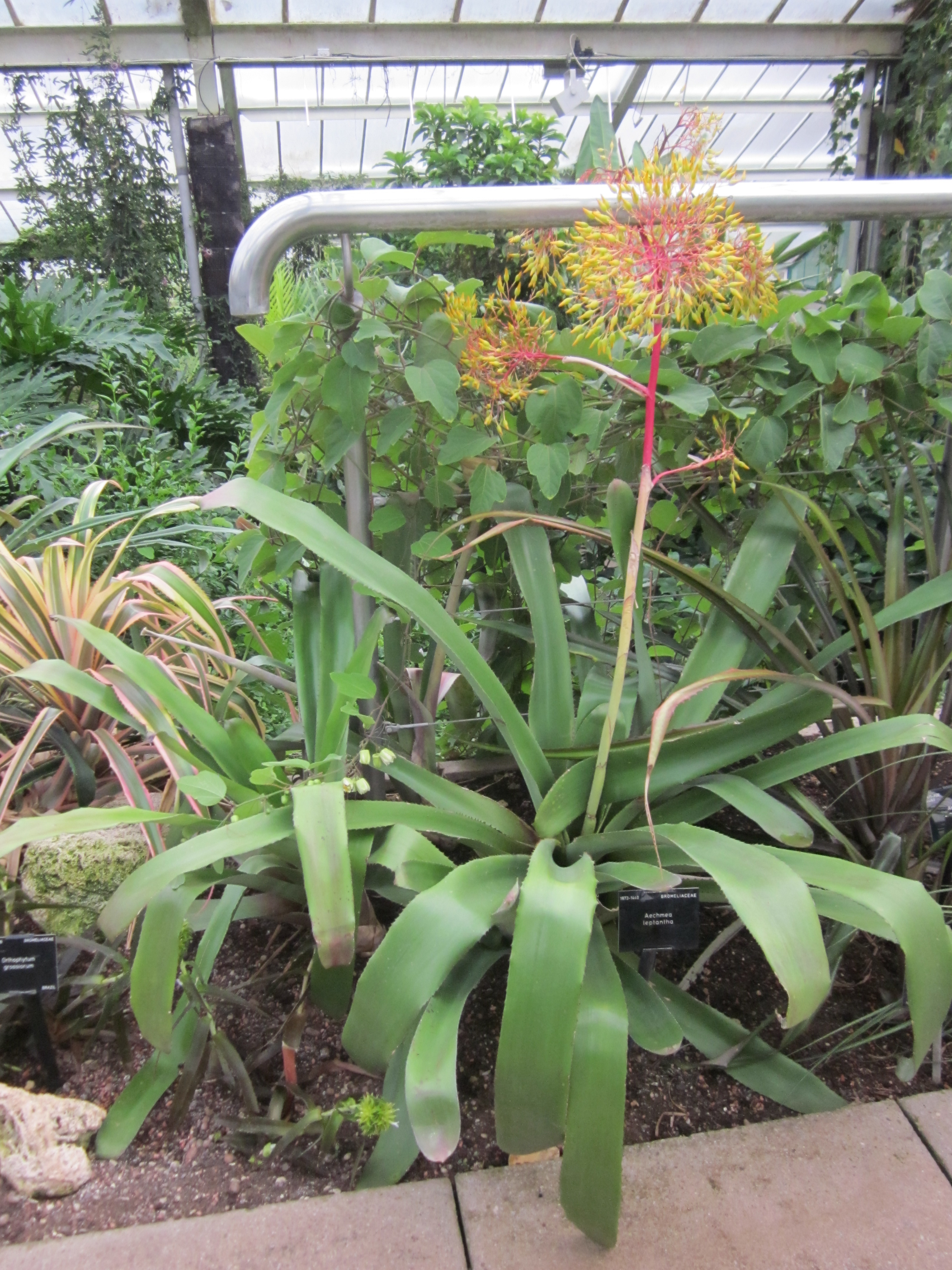

Scientific classification
- Kingdom: Plantae
- Clade: Tracheophytes
- Clade: Angiosperms
- Clade: Monocots
- Clade: Commelinids
- Order: Poales
- Family: Bromeliaceae
- Genus: Aechmea
- Subgenus: Aechmea subg. Aechmea
- Species: A. leptantha

Binomial name
- Aechmea leptantha (Harms) Leme & J.A.Siqueira

Synonyms
- Portea leptantha Harms

= Aechmea leptantha =

Species of flowering plant

Aechmea leptantha is a species of flowering plant in the genus Aechmea. This species is endemic to eastern Brazil, known from the States of Paraíba and Pernambuco.

== Cultivars ==
- x Portemea 'Lepitana'
