= Calliaspis cerdai =

Scientific classification
- Kingdom: Animalia
- Phylum: Arthropoda
- Clade: Pancrustacea
- Class: Insecta
- Order: Coleoptera
- Suborder: Polyphaga
- Infraorder: Cucujiformia
- Family: Chrysomelidae
- Genus: Calliaspis
- Species: C. cerdai

Binomial name
- Calliaspis cerdai Borowiec, 2003

Species of beetle

Calliaspis cerdai is a species of beetle of the family Chrysomelidae. It is found in French Guiana.

== Description ==
Adults reach a length of about 6.6 mm. They have a reddish head. The pronotum is black, with the sides gradually changing from black to red, and with the extreme margin yellowish-red. The anterior third of the elytral disc is black to reddish brown.

== Biology ==
The food plant is unknown.

== Etymology ==
The species is dedicated to J. A. Cerda, who first collected the species.
