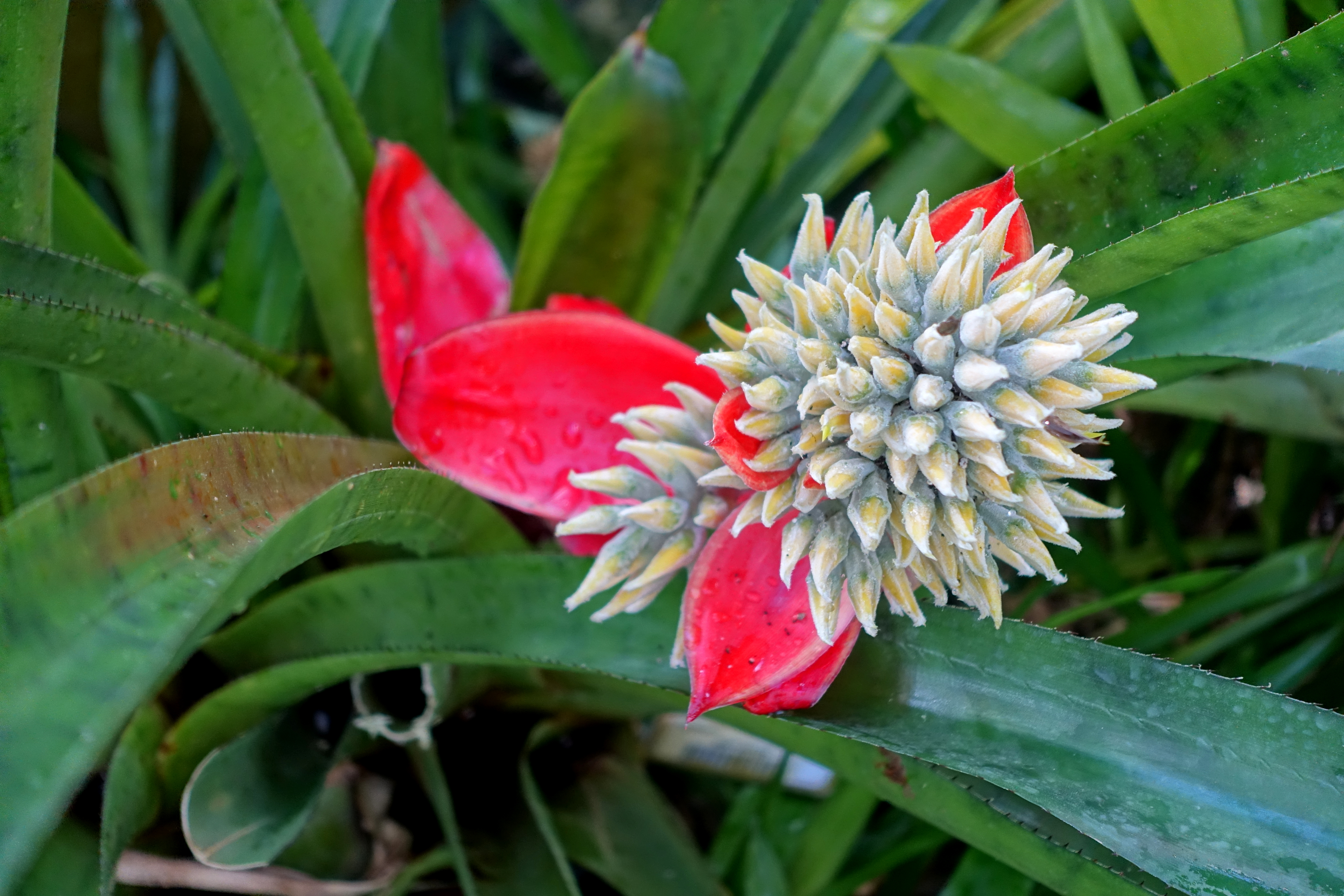

Scientific classification
- Kingdom: Plantae
- Clade: Embryophytes
- Clade: Tracheophytes
- Clade: Spermatophytes
- Clade: Angiosperms
- Clade: Monocots
- Clade: Commelinids
- Order: Poales
- Family: Bromeliaceae
- Genus: Aechmea
- Subgenus: Aechmea subg. Aechmea
- Species: A. tomentosa

Binomial name
- Aechmea tomentosa Mez

= Aechmea tomentosa =

Species of flowering plant

Aechmea tomentosa is a species of flowering plant in the family Bromeliaceae. This species is endemic to eastern Brazil, known from the States of Alagoas and Pernambuco.
