= Aechmea paradoxa =

Scientific classification
- Kingdom: Plantae
- Clade: Tracheophytes
- Clade: Angiosperms
- Clade: Monocots
- Clade: Commelinids
- Order: Poales
- Family: Bromeliaceae
- Genus: Aechmea
- Subgenus: Aechmea subg. Aechmea
- Species: A. paradoxa

Binomial name
- Aechmea paradoxa (Leme) Leme

Synonyms
- Wittrockia paradoxa Leme

Species of flowering plant

Aechmea paradoxa is a species of flowering plant in the genus Aechmea. This species is endemic to the State of Bahia in eastern Brazil.
