= Aechmea disjuncta =

Scientific classification
- Kingdom: Plantae
- Clade: Tracheophytes
- Clade: Angiosperms
- Clade: Monocots
- Clade: Commelinids
- Order: Poales
- Family: Bromeliaceae
- Genus: Aechmea
- Subgenus: Aechmea subg. Aechmea
- Species: A. disjuncta

Binomial name
- Aechmea disjuncta (L.B.Sm.) Leme & J.A.Siqueira

Synonyms
- Hohenbergia disjuncta L.B.Sm.

Species of flowering plant

Aechmea disjuncta is a species of flowering plant in the genus Aechmea. This species is endemic to the State of Bahia in eastern Brazil.
