= Calliaspis nimbata =

Scientific classification
- Kingdom: Animalia
- Phylum: Arthropoda
- Clade: Pancrustacea
- Class: Insecta
- Order: Coleoptera
- Suborder: Polyphaga
- Infraorder: Cucujiformia
- Family: Chrysomelidae
- Genus: Calliaspis
- Species: C. nimbata

Binomial name
- Calliaspis nimbata (Perty, 1834)

Synonyms
- Himatidium nimbata Perty, 1834; Imatidium resplendens Boheman, 1850; Calliaspis porphyrio Boheman, 1850

Species of beetle

Calliaspis nimbata is a species of beetle of the family Chrysomelidae. It is found in Brazil (Pará) and French Guiana. It not known what they eat.
