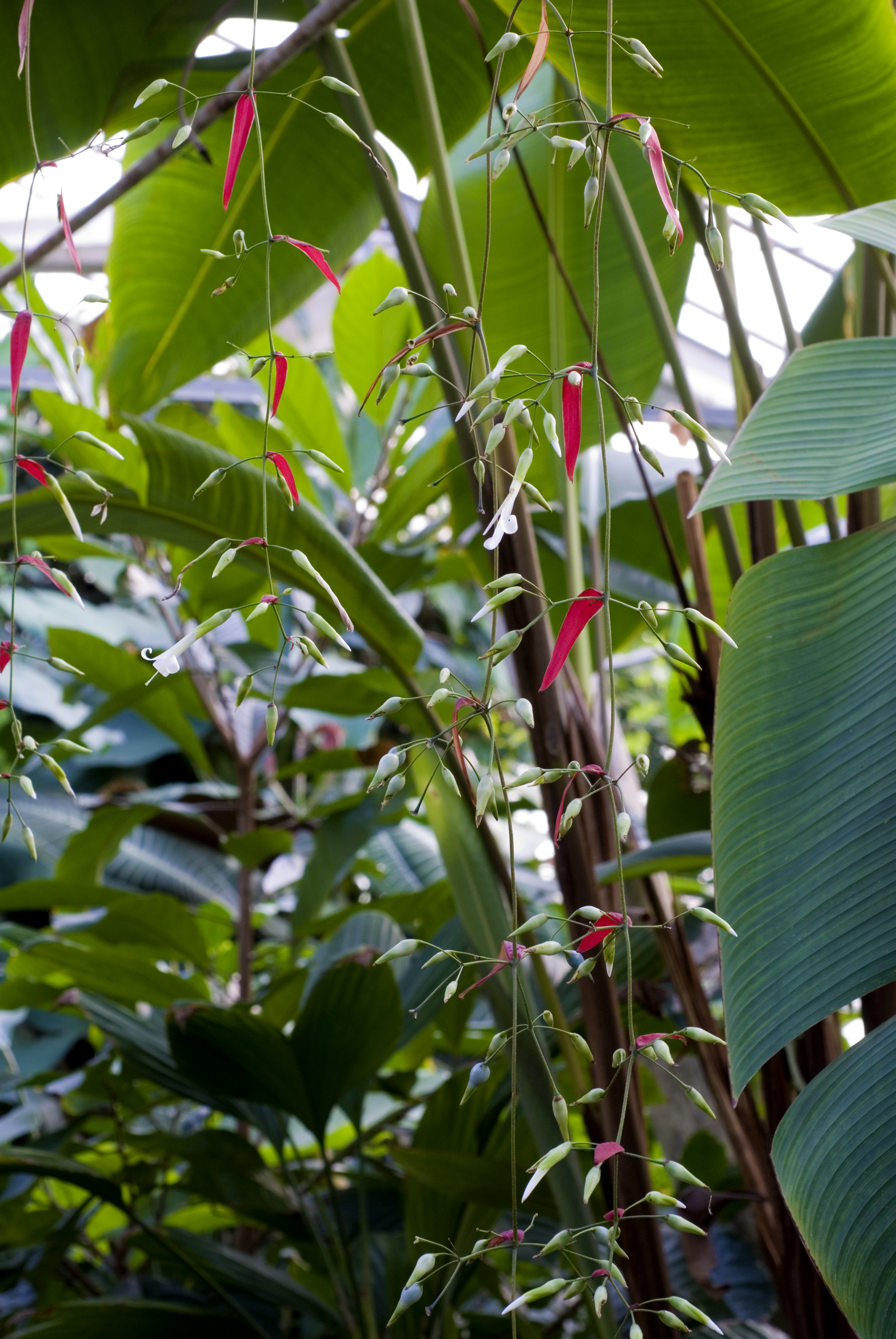

Scientific classification
- Kingdom: Plantae
- Clade: Tracheophytes
- Clade: Angiosperms
- Clade: Monocots
- Clade: Commelinids
- Order: Poales
- Family: Bromeliaceae
- Genus: Aechmea
- Subgenus: Aechmea subg. Aechmea
- Species: A. filicaulis

Binomial name
- Aechmea filicaulis (Griseb.) Mez

Synonyms
- Billbergia filicaulis Griseb.

= Aechmea filicaulis =

Species of flowering plant

Aechmea filicaulis is a species of flowering plant in the family Bromeliaceae. This species is endemic to Venezuela.
