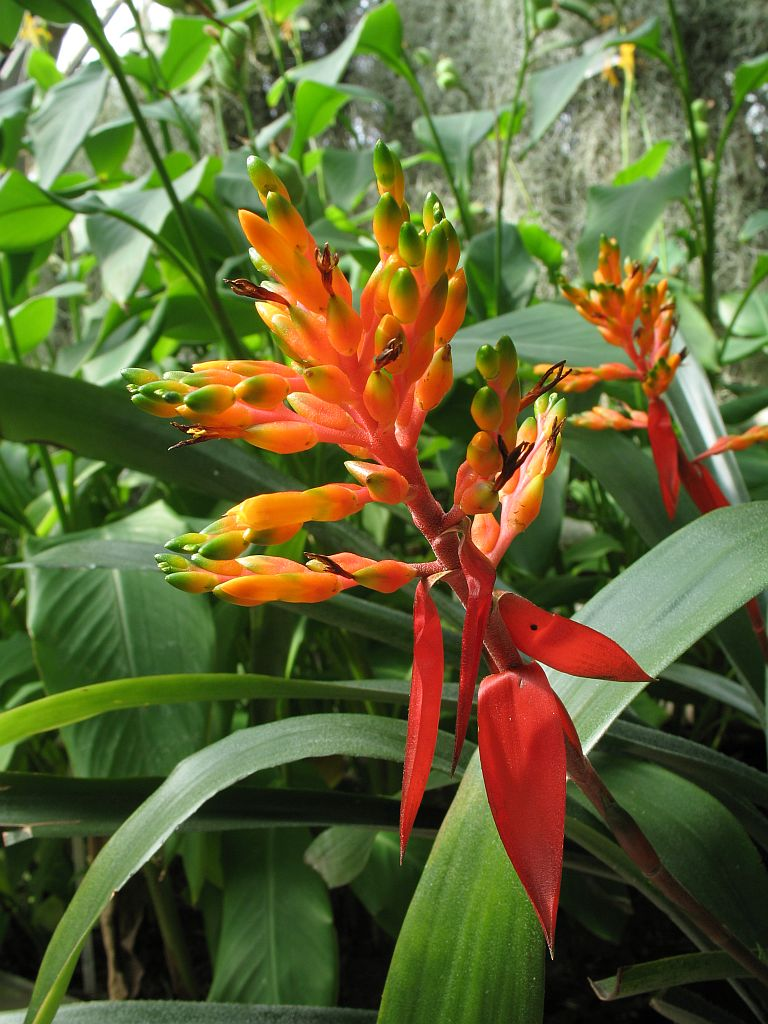

Scientific classification
- Kingdom: Plantae
- Clade: Tracheophytes
- Clade: Angiosperms
- Clade: Monocots
- Clade: Commelinids
- Order: Poales
- Family: Bromeliaceae
- Genus: Aechmea
- Subgenus: Aechmea subg. Aechmea
- Species: A. penduliflora

Binomial name
- Aechmea penduliflora André

Synonyms
- Billbergia paniculata Mart. ex Schult. & Schult.f.; Aechmea schultesiana Mez; Aechmea friedrichsthalii Mez & Donn.Sm.; Aechmea inermis Mez

= Aechmea penduliflora =

Species of plant

Aechmea penduliflora is a species of flowering plant in the Bromeliaceae family. It is native to Central America (Costa Rica, Nicaragua, Panama) and northern South America (Venezuela, Brazil, Guyana, Colombia, Peru and Ecuador).

== Cultivars ==
- Aechmea 'RaRu'
- Aechmea 'Valencia'
- Aechmea 'Wally's Wand'
