= Calliaspis cinnabarina =

Scientific classification
- Kingdom: Animalia
- Phylum: Arthropoda
- Clade: Pancrustacea
- Class: Insecta
- Order: Coleoptera
- Suborder: Polyphaga
- Infraorder: Cucujiformia
- Family: Chrysomelidae
- Genus: Calliaspis
- Species: C. cinnabarina

Binomial name
- Calliaspis cinnabarina Boheman, 1850

Species of beetle

Calliaspis cinnabarina is a species of beetle of the family Chrysomelidae. It is found in Brazil (Rio de Janeiro, São Paulo), French Guiana, Peru and Suriname.

== Biology ==
The food plant is unknown.
