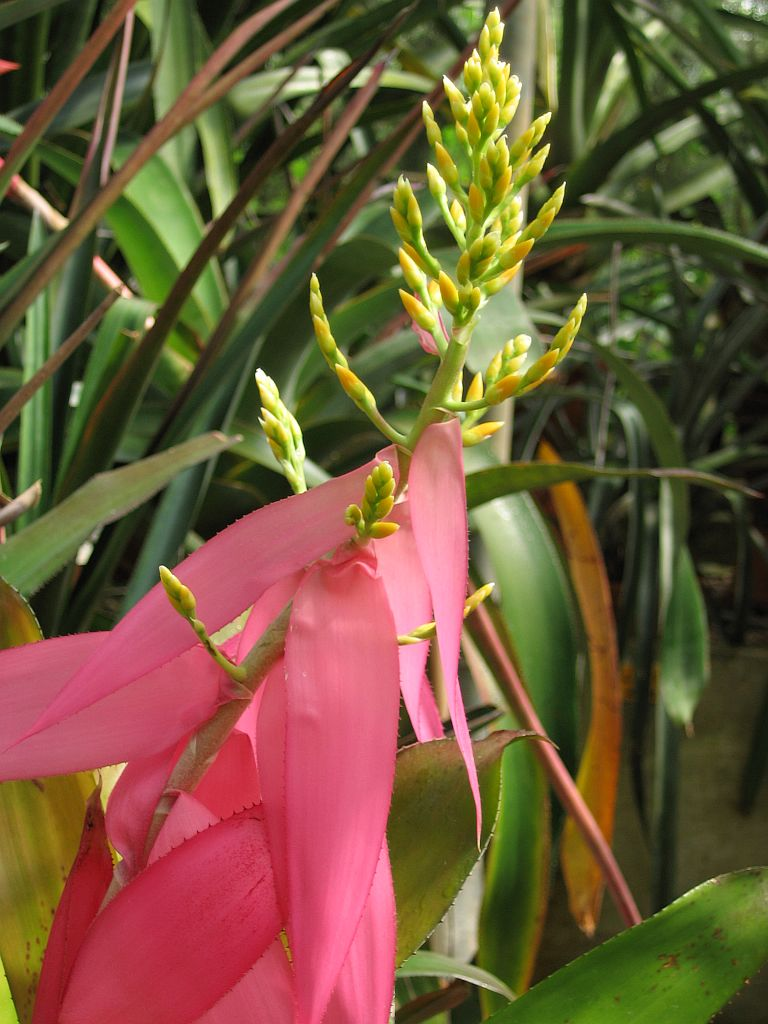
- Aechmea nallyi in cultivation at the Botanical Garden of Heidelberg, Germany.

Scientific classification
- Kingdom: Plantae
- Clade: Tracheophytes
- Clade: Angiosperms
- Clade: Monocots
- Clade: Commelinids
- Order: Poales
- Family: Bromeliaceae
- Genus: Aechmea
- Subgenus: Aechmea subg. Aechmea
- Species: A. nallyi

Binomial name
- Aechmea nallyi L.B.Sm.

= Aechmea nallyi =

Species of plant

Aechmea nallyi is a plant species in the genus Aechmea. It is endemic to the Loreto region of Peru but cultivated elsewhere as an ornamental.

== Cultivars ==
- Aechmea 'Olive Smith'
