= Aechmea aculeatosepala =

Conservation status
- Vulnerable (IUCN 3.1)

Scientific classification
- Kingdom: Plantae
- Clade: Tracheophytes
- Clade: Angiosperms
- Clade: Monocots
- Clade: Commelinids
- Order: Poales
- Family: Bromeliaceae
- Genus: Aechmea
- Species: A. aculeatosepala

Binomial name
- Aechmea aculeatosepala (Rauh & Barthlott) Leme

Synonyms
- Neoregelia aculeatosepala Rauh & Barthlott

Species of flowering plant

Aechmea aculeatosepala is a species of plant in the family Bromeliaceae. It is endemic to Ecuador. Its natural habitats are subtropical or tropical moist lowland forests and subtropical or tropical moist montane forests. It is threatened by habitat loss.
