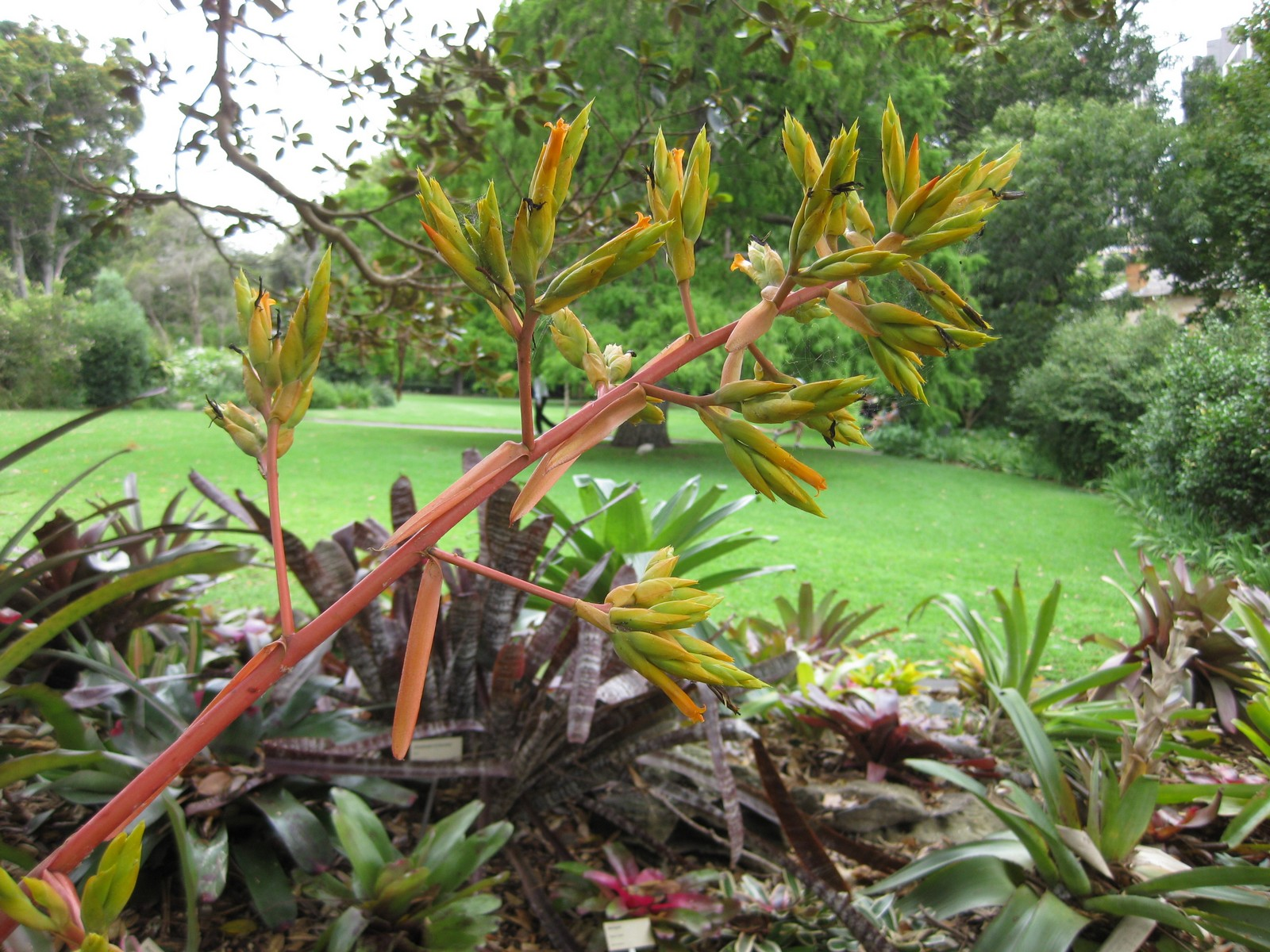

Scientific classification
- Kingdom: Plantae
- Clade: Tracheophytes
- Clade: Angiosperms
- Clade: Monocots
- Clade: Commelinids
- Order: Poales
- Family: Bromeliaceae
- Genus: Aechmea
- Subgenus: Aechmea subg. Aechmea
- Species: A. rubens

Binomial name
- Aechmea rubens (L.B.Sm.) L.B.Sm.

Synonyms
- Gravisia rubens L.B.Sm.

= Aechmea rubens =

Species of flowering plant

Aechmea rubens is a plant species in the genus Aechmea. It was described from specimens cultivated in the Jardin Botanique de Montréal, supposedly grown from Brazilian material. The exact place of origin is unknown, and the species has not been located in the wild.

== Cultivars ==
Several cultivars are recognized

- Aechmea 'Isabel D'Bellard'
- Aechmea 'Laura Lynn'
- Aechmea 'Tropica'
