= Harry E. Luther =

American botanist (1952–2012)

Harry E. Luther (1952 – October 17, 2012) was an American botanist, having conducted extensive botanical expeditions to Florida, Mexico, Panama, Bolivia, Colombia, Ecuador, Peru and Brazil. Luther served on the staff of the Marie Selby Botanical Gardens in Sarasota, Florida, for 32 years. In 2010, he accepted a position as Assistant Director/Horticulture at Singapore's famed Gardens by the Bay.

He is recognized internationally as an expert in bromeliads (family Bromeliaceae). He described more than 250 new bromeliad species, and authored more than 200 scientific and popular publications.

He was the director of the Bromeliad Identification Center, working for 32 years at the Marie Selby Botanical Gardens in Sarasota, Florida where he assembled "the world's largest living collection of bromeliad species".

Luther identified and named bromeliads for Sarasota Botanical Gardens, the Missouri Botanical Garden, the New York Botanical Garden, and "anyone else around the world who needs a plant identification". He took part in 10-year project to identify all the plants of Ecuador and described 60 new species of bromeliads. He moved on to a similar project in Costa Rica.

The Bromeliad Society International (BSI) encourages public education, conservation, and scientific research of bromeliads by funding the "Harry E. Luther & Victoria Padilla Research, Conservation and Education Fund".

The winter 2012-2013 edition of the Journal of the Bromeliad Society was called the "Harry E. Luther Memorial Issue".

== Publications ==
- Harry E. Luther: An Alphabetical List of Bromeliad Binomials, 2008 in The Marie Selby Botanical Gardens, Sarasota, Florida, USA. The Bromeliad Society International. This is the new List of 54 Genera.
- Luther, Harry E.; Benzing, David H. (2009). Native Bromeliads of Florids. Rowman & Littlefield. ISBN 9781561648825.

The standard author abbreviation H.Luther is used to indicate this person as the author when citing a botanical name.

== Sources ==
- "Harry E. Luther". International Plant Names Index (IPNI). Royal Botanic Gardens, Kew; Harvard University Herbaria & Libraries; Australian National Botanic Gardens.
- Bromeliad Society International - article on Harry E. Luther
