= C. exigua =

C. exigua may refer to:

- Calamintha exigua, a flowering plant
- Campanula exigua, a bluebell endemic to California
- Canistropsis exigua, a plant endemic to Brazil
- Canna exigua, a garden plant
- Claytonia exigua, a western North American wildflower
- Cnaphalocrocis exigua, a grass moth
- Corticarina exigua, a minute brown scavenger beetle
- Curcuma exigua, a perennial herb
- Cymbella exigua, a unicellular algae
- Cymothoa exigua, a parasitic crustacean
