= Cnaphalocrocis patnalis =

Scientific classification
- Kingdom: Animalia
- Phylum: Arthropoda
- Clade: Pancrustacea
- Class: Insecta
- Order: Lepidoptera
- Family: Crambidae
- Genus: Cnaphalocrocis
- Species: C. patnalis

Binomial name
- Cnaphalocrocis patnalis (Bradley, 1981)

Synonyms
- Marasmia patnalis Bradley, 1981

Species of moth

Cnaphalocrocis patnalis is a moth in the family Crambidae. It was described by John David Bradley in 1981. It is found in south-east Asia, where it has been recorded from Sri Lanka, India, Malaysia, Indonesia and the Philippines.

The larvae feed on Cynodon dactylon, Cyperus difformis, Cyperus iria, Cyperus rotundus, Dactyloctenium aegyptium, Echinochloa colona, Echinochloa crus-galli, Imperata cylindrica, Leersia hexandra, Leptochloa chinensis, Oryza sativa, Paspalum conjugatum, Paspalum distichum, Paspalum scrobiculatum, Saccharum officinarum, Sorghum bicolor, Sporobolus and Zea mays.
