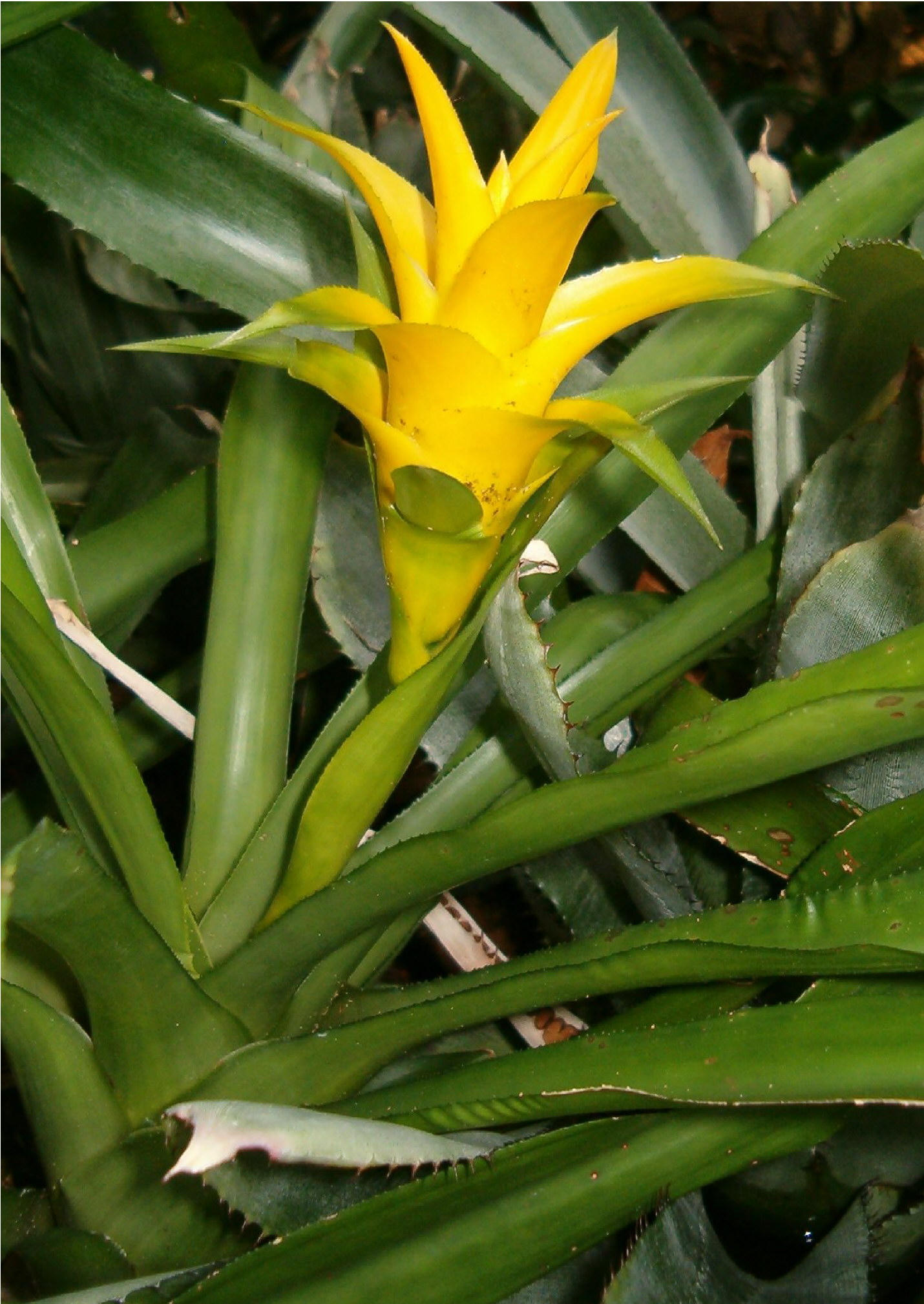
- Canistropsis billbergioides

Scientific classification
- Kingdom: Plantae
- Clade: Embryophytes
- Clade: Tracheophytes
- Clade: Spermatophytes
- Clade: Angiosperms
- Clade: Monocots
- Clade: Commelinids
- Order: Poales
- Family: Bromeliaceae
- Subfamily: Bromelioideae
- Genus: Canistropsis (Mez) Leme

Species
- See text

= Canistropsis =

Genus of flowering plants

Canistropsis is a genus of plants in the family Bromeliaceae, subfamily Bromelioideae. The genus name is from the genus Canistrum and the Greek “opsis” (resembling).

All 11 species of this genus are endemic to the Atlantic Forest biome (Mata Atlantica Brasileira), located in southeastern Brazil.

== Species ==
Species of the genus according to Plants of the World Online as of February 2023:

Image	Scientific name	Distribution
	Canistropsis albiflora (L.B.Sm.) H.Luther & Leme	
	Canistropsis billbergioides (Schultes f.) Leme	
	Canistropsis burchellii (Baker) Leme	
	Canistropsis correia-araujoi (E.Pereira & Leme) Leme	
	Canistropsis elata (E.Pereira & Leme) Leme	
	Canistropsis exigua (E.Pereira & Leme) Leme	
	Canistropsis marceloi (E.Pereira & Moutinho) Leme	
	Canistropsis microps (E.Morren ex Mez) Leme	
	Canistropsis pulcherrima (E.Pereira) Leme	
	Canistropsis seidelii (L.B.Sm. & Reitz) Leme	
