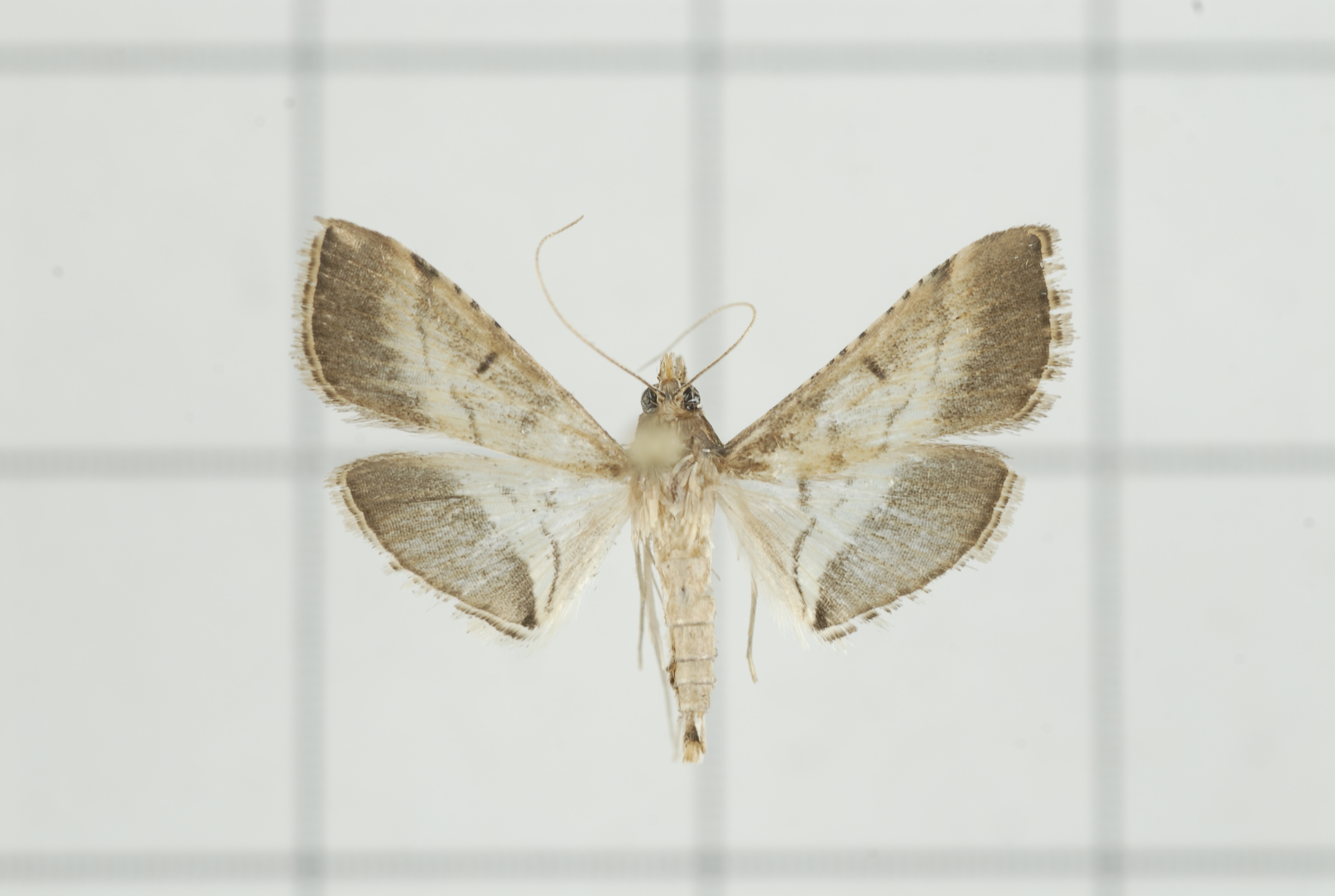

Scientific classification
- Kingdom: Animalia
- Phylum: Arthropoda
- Clade: Pancrustacea
- Class: Insecta
- Order: Lepidoptera
- Family: Crambidae
- Genus: Cnaphalocrocis
- Species: C. euryterminalis

Binomial name
- Cnaphalocrocis euryterminalis (Hampson, 1917)

Synonyms
- Marasmia euryterminalis Hampson, 1917

= Cnaphalocrocis euryterminalis =

Species of moth

Cnaphalocrocis euryterminalis is a moth in the family Crambidae. It was described by George Hampson in 1917. It is found in India (Assam), Taiwan and Japan (Kyushu, Yakushima, the Tokara Islands, Amami Ōshima).

The wings are pale yellowish brown.
