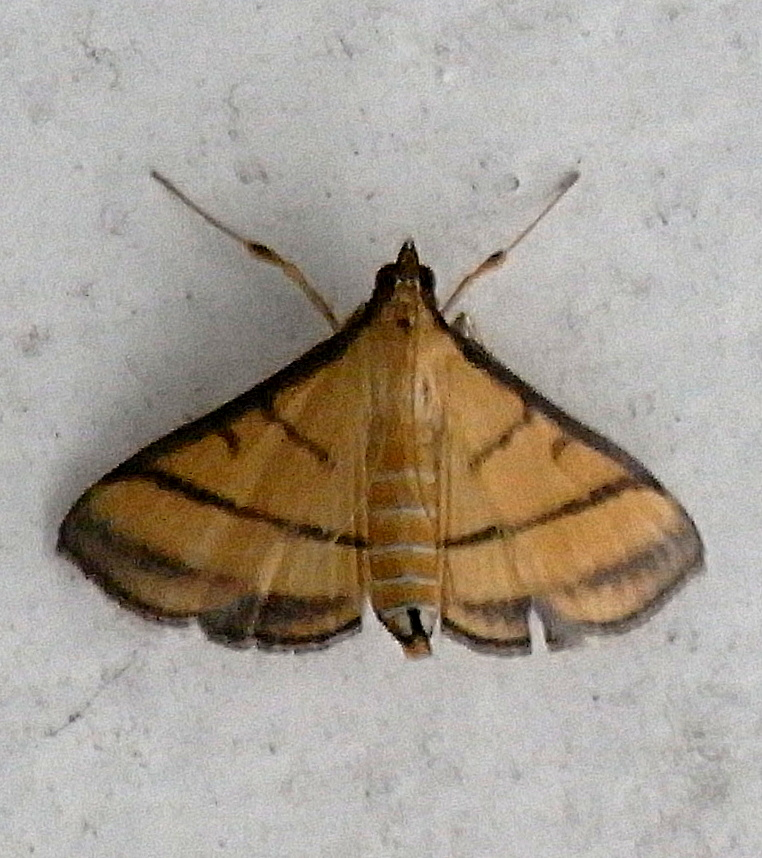
- Rice leaf roller

Scientific classification
- Kingdom: Animalia
- Phylum: Arthropoda
- Clade: Pancrustacea
- Class: Insecta
- Order: Lepidoptera
- Family: Crambidae
- Subfamily: Spilomelinae
- Genus: Cnaphalocrocis; Lederer, 1863

Synonyms
- Bradinomorpha Matsumura, 1920; Dolichosticha Meyrick, 1884; Epimima Meyrick, 1886; Lasiacme Warren, 1896; Marasmia Lederer, 1863; Marasma; Neomarasmia Kalra, David & Banerji, 1967; Prodotaula Meyrick, 1934; Susumia Marumo, 1930

= Cnaphalocrocis =

Genus of moths

Cnaphalocrocis is a genus of moths of the family Crambidae. The genus was described by Julius Lederer in 1863.

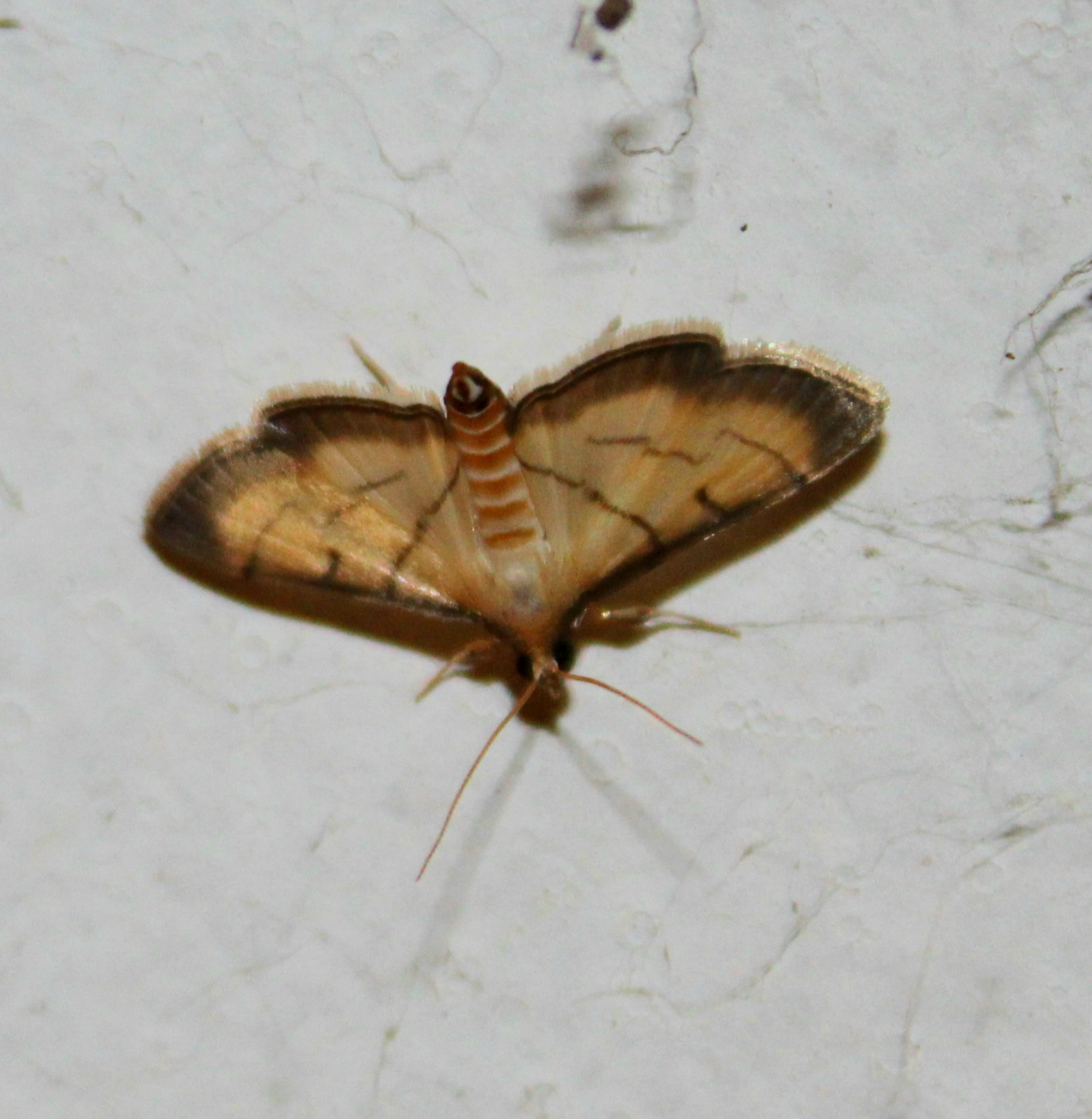
in Sri Lanka

== Species ==
- Cnaphalocrocis araealis (Hampson, 1912)
- Cnaphalocrocis bilinealis (Hampson, 1891)
- Cnaphalocrocis brunneofusalis (Hampson, 1917)
- Cnaphalocrocis binalis (Zeller, 1852)
- Cnaphalocrocis carstensziana (Rothschild, 1916)
- Cnaphalocrocis cochrusalis (Walker, 1859)
- Cnaphalocrocis conformis (Meyrick, 1934)
- Cnaphalocrocis daisensis (Shibuya, 1929)
- Cnaphalocrocis didialis (Viette, 1958)
- Cnaphalocrocis euryterminalis (Hampson, 1917)
- Cnaphalocrocis exigua (Butler, 1879)
- Cnaphalocrocis fusifascialis (Hampson, 1896)
- Cnaphalocrocis grisealis (Ghesquière, 1942)
- Cnaphalocrocis grucheti (Viette, 1976)
- Cnaphalocrocis hemicrossa (Meyrick, 1887)
- Cnaphalocrocis hexagona (Lower, 1903)
- Cnaphalocrocis iolealis (Walker, 1859)
- Cnaphalocrocis laticostalis (Hampson, 1912)
- Cnaphalocrocis latimarginalis (Hampson, 1891)
- Cnaphalocrocis liliicola (Ghesquière, 1942)
- Cnaphalocrocis limbalis (Wileman, 1911)
- Cnaphalocrocis loxodesma (Turner, 1915)
- Cnaphalocrocis medinalis (Guenée, 1854)
- Cnaphalocrocis nawae (Matsumura, 1920)
- Cnaphalocrocis patnalis Bradley, 1981
- Cnaphalocrocis pauperalis (Strand, 1918)
- Cnaphalocrocis pilosa Warren, 1896
- Cnaphalocrocis poeyalis (Boisduval, 1833)
- Cnaphalocrocis rutilalis (Walker, 1859)
- Cnaphalocrocis sanitalis Snellen, 1880
- Cnaphalocrocis similis Hedemann, 1894
- Cnaphalocrocis sordidalis Rothschild, 1915
- Cnaphalocrocis stereogona (Meyrick, 1886)
- Cnaphalocrocis subvenilialis (Snellen, 1895)
- Cnaphalocrocis trapezalis (Guenée, 1854)
- Cnaphalocrocis trebiusalis (Walker, 1859)

== Former species ==
- Cnaphalocrocis perpersalis Möschler, 1890
- Cnaphalocrocis ruptalis (Walker, 1866)
