= Cnaphalocrocis hexagona =

Scientific classification
- Kingdom: Animalia
- Phylum: Arthropoda
- Clade: Pancrustacea
- Class: Insecta
- Order: Lepidoptera
- Family: Crambidae
- Genus: Cnaphalocrocis
- Species: C. hexagona

Binomial name
- Cnaphalocrocis hexagona (Lower, 1903)

Synonyms
- Marasmia hexagona Lower, 1903

Species of moth

Cnaphalocrocis hexagona is a moth in the family Crambidae. It was described by Oswald Bertram Lower in 1903. It is found in Australia, where it has been recorded from Queensland and the Northern Territory.

The wingspan is about 12 mm. The forewings are pale brassy-yellow, with fuscous markings. There is a fine slightly outwardly curved line from one-fourth of the costa to one-fourth of the inner margin and a second from beneath the costa in the middle, curved outwards and slightly sinuate beneath, ending on the inner margin about the middle. The third runs from the costa at three-fourths to the inner margin at three-fourths. There is a faint fuscous subterminal shade and a fine line along the termen. The hindwings are similar to the forewings.
