= Cnaphalocrocis brunneofusalis =

Scientific classification
- Kingdom: Animalia
- Phylum: Arthropoda
- Clade: Pancrustacea
- Class: Insecta
- Order: Lepidoptera
- Family: Crambidae
- Genus: Cnaphalocrocis
- Species: C. brunneofusalis

Binomial name
- Cnaphalocrocis brunneofusalis (Hampson, 1917)

Synonyms
- Marasmia brunneofusalis Hampson, 1917

Species of moth

Cnaphalocrocis brunneofusalis is a moth in the family Crambidae. It was described by George Hampson in 1917. It is found in Malawi.
