= Cnaphalocrocis exigua =

Scientific classification
- Kingdom: Animalia
- Phylum: Arthropoda
- Clade: Pancrustacea
- Class: Insecta
- Order: Lepidoptera
- Family: Crambidae
- Genus: Cnaphalocrocis
- Species: C. exigua

Binomial name
- Cnaphalocrocis exigua (Butler, 1879)

Synonyms
- Samea exigua Butler, 1879; Marasmia exigua

Species of moth

Cnaphalocrocis exigua is a moth in the family Crambidae. It was described by Arthur Gardiner Butler in 1879. It is found in Japan, China and on Fiji.

The larvae feed on the leaves of Cynodon dactylon, Cyperus, Dactyloctenium aegyptium, Echinochloa colona, Echinochloa crus-galli, Imperata cylindrica, Leersia hexandra, Leptochloa chinensis, Oryza sativa, Panicum repens, Paspalum species (including Paspalum conjugatum, Paspalum distichum), Sorghum bicolor, Sporobolus, Urochloa mutica and Zea mays. They fold the leaves of their host plant, feeding inside.
