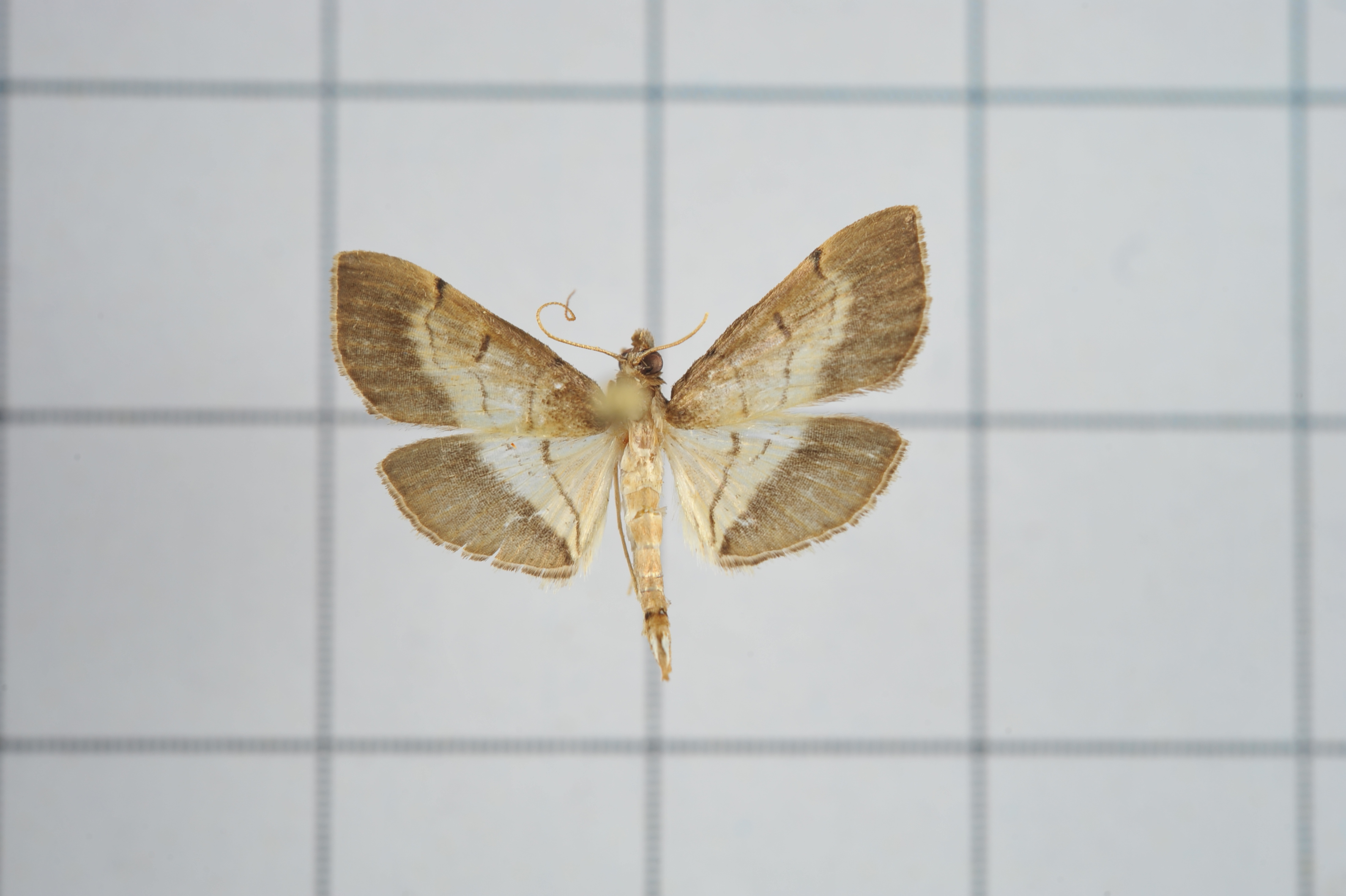

Scientific classification
- Kingdom: Animalia
- Phylum: Arthropoda
- Clade: Pancrustacea
- Class: Insecta
- Order: Lepidoptera
- Family: Crambidae
- Genus: Cnaphalocrocis
- Species: C. pilosa

Binomial name
- Cnaphalocrocis pilosa (Warren, 1896)

Synonyms
- Lasiacme pilosa Warren, 1896

= Cnaphalocrocis pilosa =

Species of moth

Cnaphalocrocis pilosa is a moth in the family Crambidae. It was described by Warren in 1896. It is found in India.

The wingspan is about 24 mm. The forewings are suffused with dark fuscous grey on a pale ground colour. The hindwings are white with a fuscous border.
