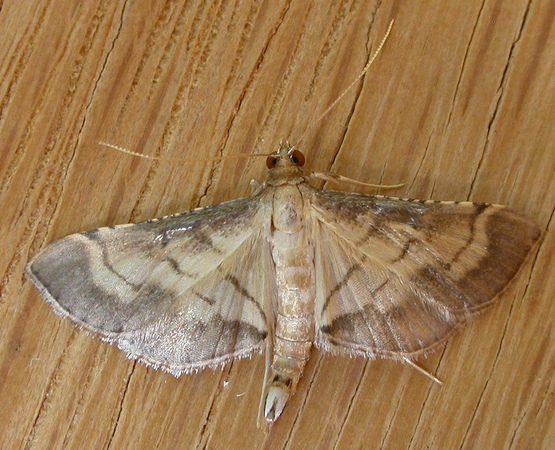

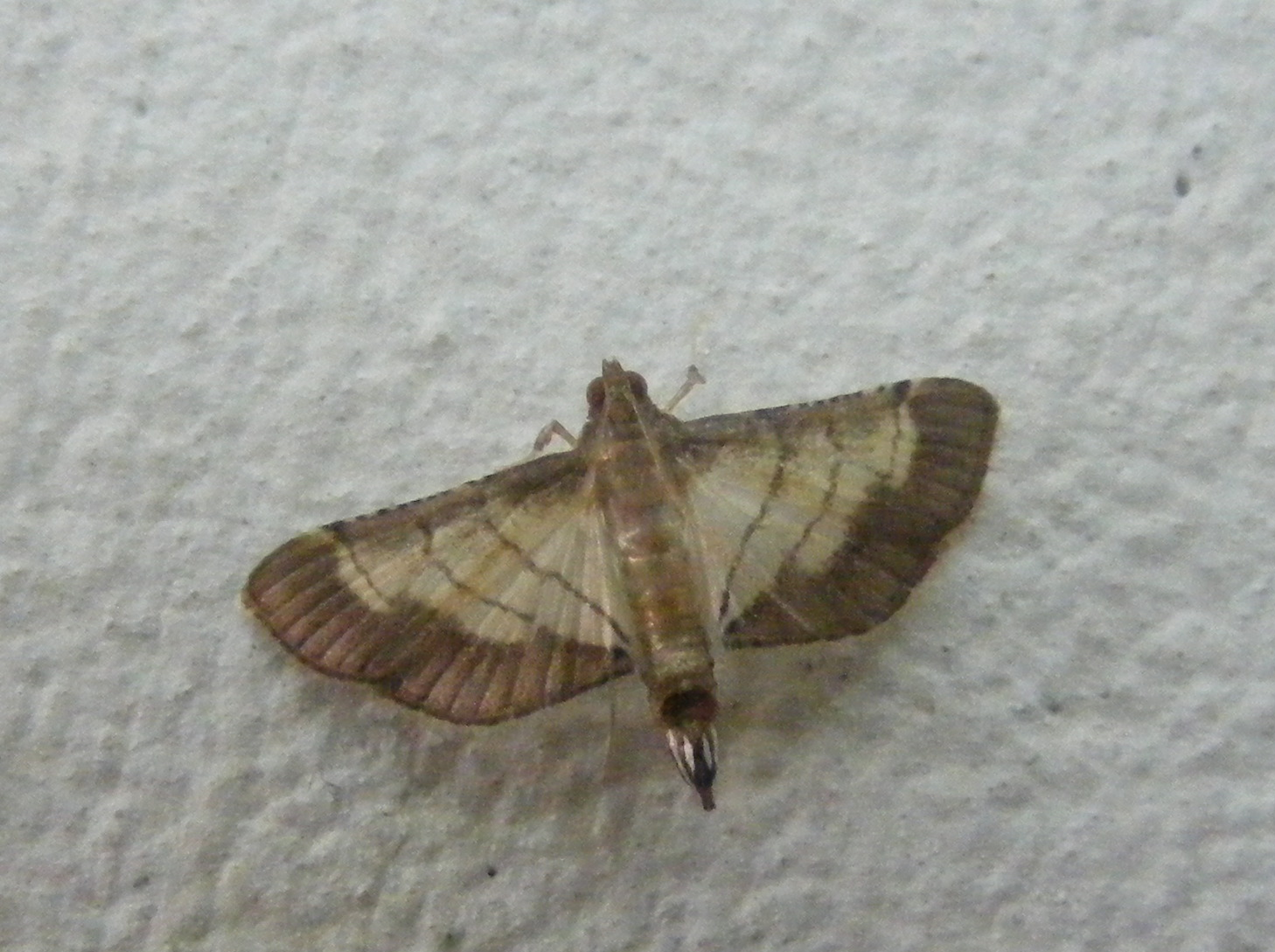

Scientific classification
- Kingdom: Animalia
- Phylum: Arthropoda
- Clade: Pancrustacea
- Class: Insecta
- Order: Lepidoptera
- Family: Crambidae
- Genus: Cnaphalocrocis
- Species: C. poeyalis

Binomial name
- Cnaphalocrocis poeyalis (Boisduval, 1833)

Synonyms
- Botys poeyalis Boisduval, 1833; Asopia venilialis Walker, 1859; Botys marisalis Walker, 1859; Botys minutalis Mabille, 1879; Botys ruralis Walker, 1859; Lasiacme mimica Warren, 1896; Marasmia cicatricosa Lederer, 1863; Marasmia hampsoni Rothschild, 1921; Marasmia rectistrigosa Snellen, 1872

= Cnaphalocrocis poeyalis =

Species of moth

Cnaphalocrocis poeyalis, the lesser rice-leafroller, is a species of moth of the family Crambidae described by Jean Baptiste Boisduval in 1833. They can be found from Africa to the Pacific region, including Australia, Réunion, India, Fiji, Hong Kong and French Polynesia.

Their wingspan is about 20 mm.

== Nutrition ==
They feed on grasses (Poaceae) and are a pest of rice (Oryza sativa).
