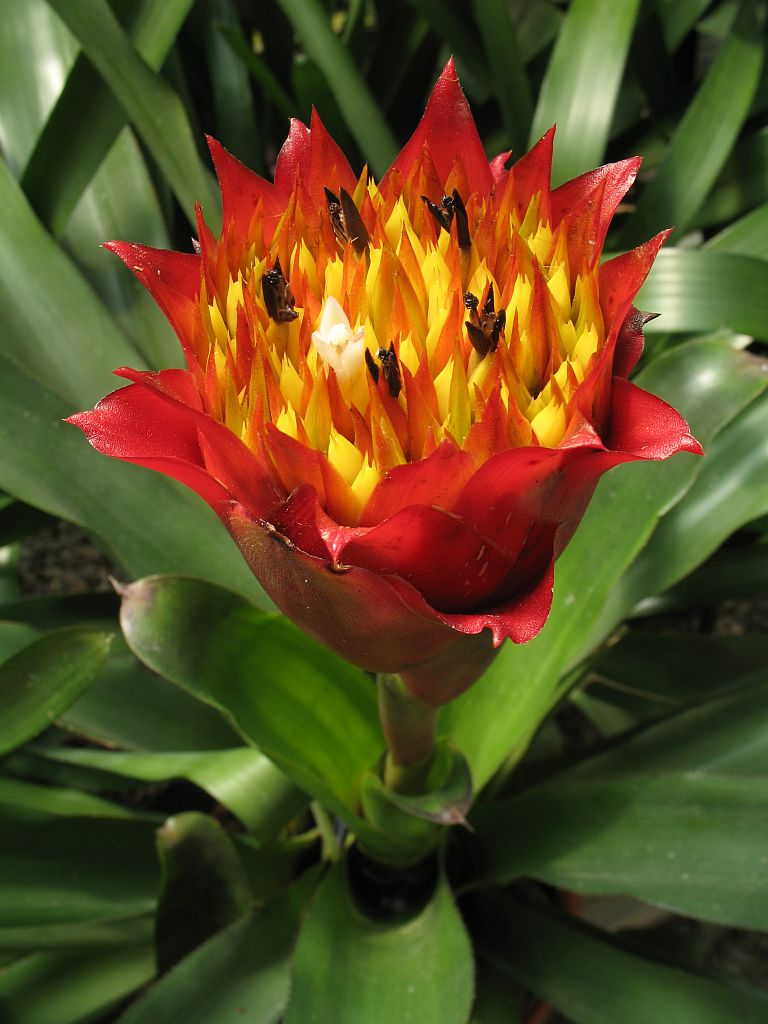

Scientific classification
- Kingdom: Plantae
- Clade: Tracheophytes
- Clade: Angiosperms
- Clade: Monocots
- Clade: Commelinids
- Order: Poales
- Family: Bromeliaceae
- Genus: Canistrum
- Species: C. aurantiacum

Binomial name
- Canistrum aurantiacum E.Morren

= Canistrum aurantiacum =

Species of flowering plant

Canistrum aurantiacum is a plant species in the genus Canistrum. This species is endemic to Brazil.

== Cultivars ==
- × Canmea 'Carmin'
