= Cnaphalocrocis similis =

Scientific classification
- Kingdom: Animalia
- Phylum: Arthropoda
- Clade: Pancrustacea
- Class: Insecta
- Order: Lepidoptera
- Family: Crambidae
- Genus: Cnaphalocrocis
- Species: C. similis

Binomial name
- Cnaphalocrocis similis Hedemann, 1894

Species of moth

Cnaphalocrocis similis is a moth in the family Crambidae. It is found on the U.S. Virgin Islands.
