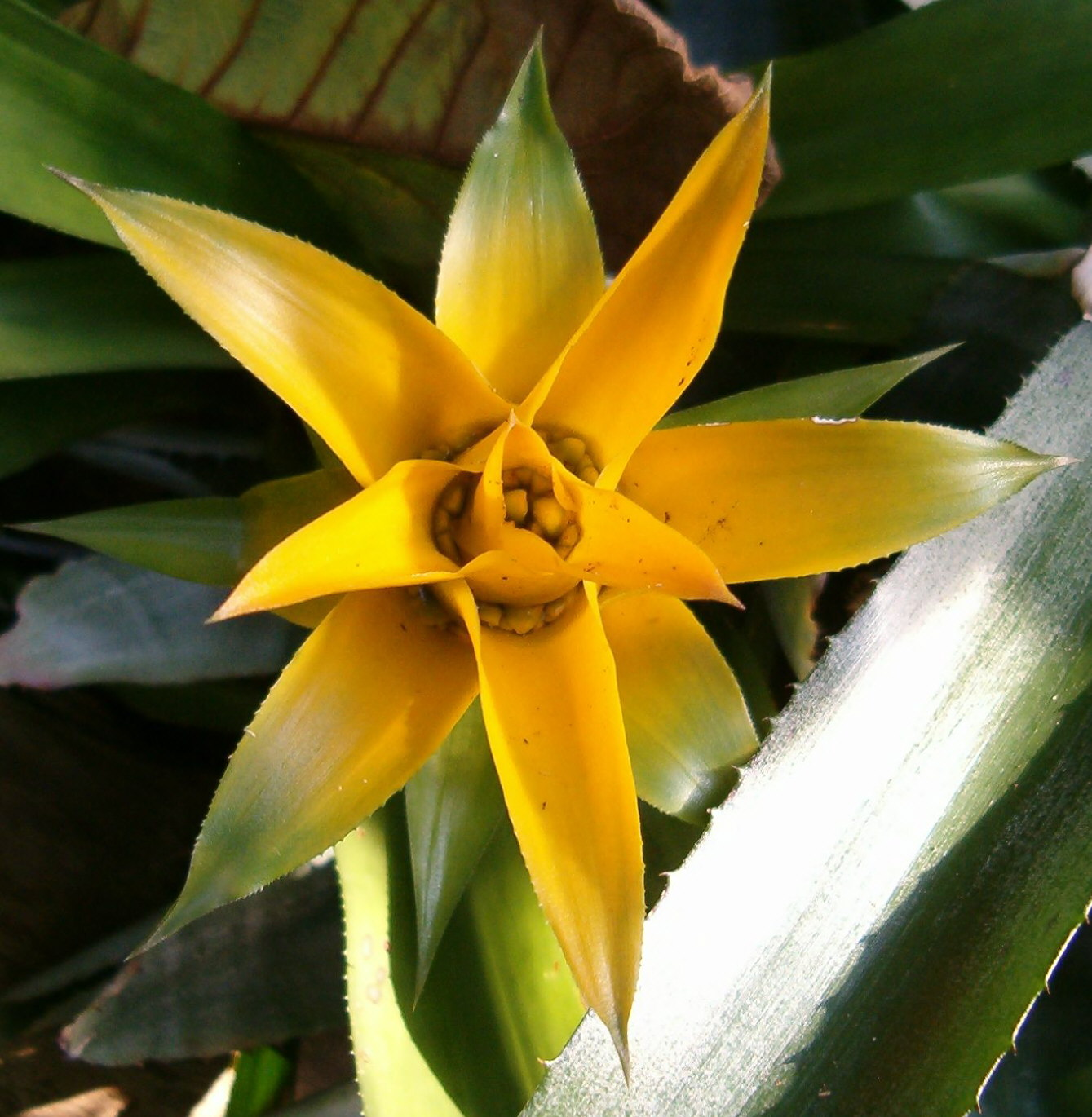

Scientific classification
- Kingdom: Plantae
- Clade: Tracheophytes
- Clade: Angiosperms
- Clade: Monocots
- Clade: Commelinids
- Order: Poales
- Family: Bromeliaceae
- Genus: Canistropsis
- Species: C. billbergioides

Binomial name
- Canistropsis billbergioides (Schultes f.) Leme

= Canistropsis billbergioides =

Species of flowering plant

Canistropsis billbergioides is a species of flowering plant in the genus Canistropsis. This species is endemic to Brazil.

Two forms may be recognized:

- Canistropsis billbergioides f. azurea
- Canistropsis billbergioides f. billbergioides

== Gallery ==
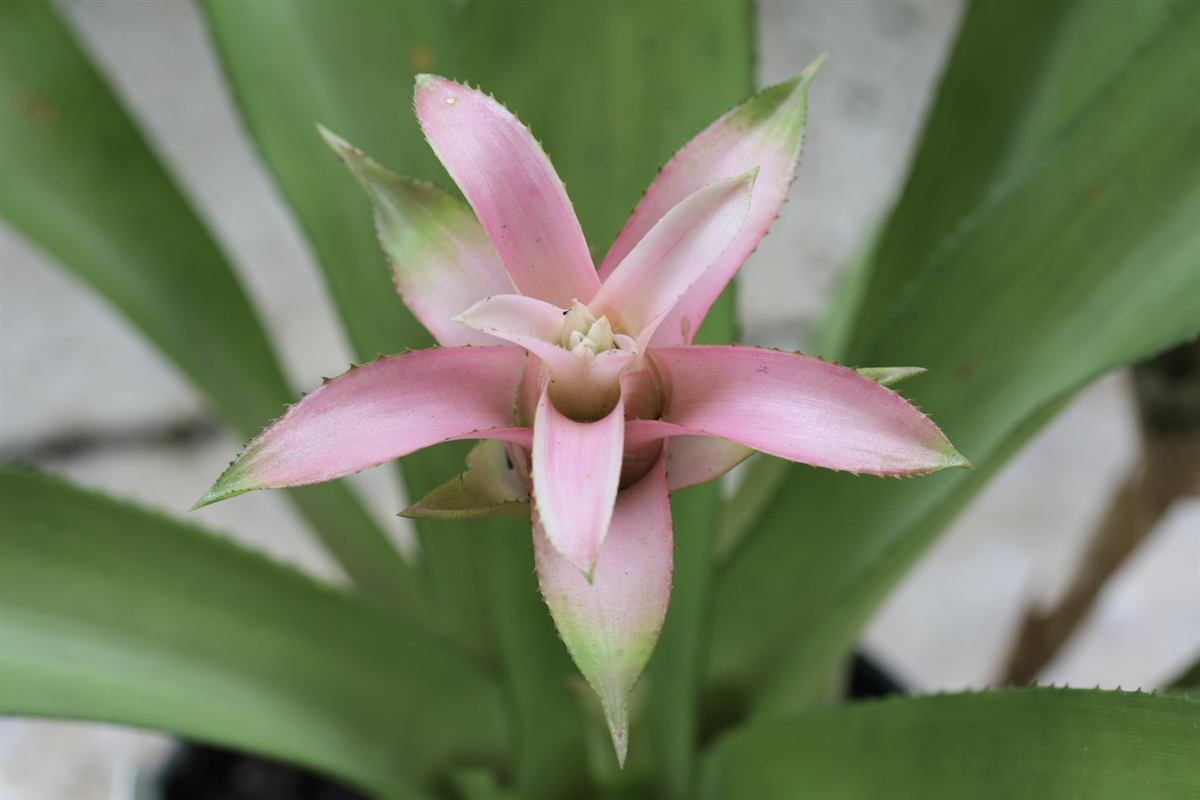
Pink form

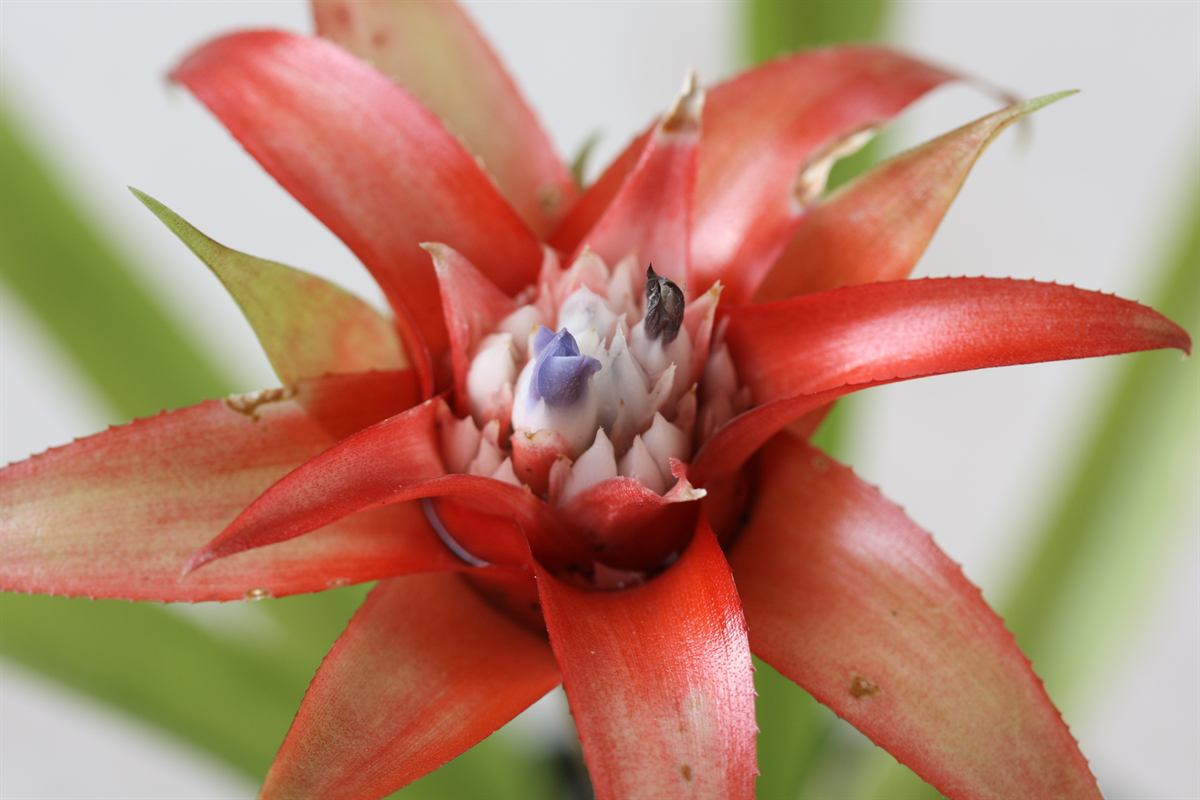
forma azurea
