= Cnaphalocrocis carstensziana =

Scientific classification
- Kingdom: Animalia
- Phylum: Arthropoda
- Clade: Pancrustacea
- Class: Insecta
- Order: Lepidoptera
- Family: Crambidae
- Genus: Cnaphalocrocis
- Species: C. carstensziana

Binomial name
- Cnaphalocrocis carstensziana (Rothschild, 1916)

Synonyms
- Marasmia carstensziana Rothschild, 1916

Species of moth

Cnaphalocrocis carstensziana is a moth in the family Crambidae. It was described by Rothschild in 1916. It is found in Papua New Guinea.
