= Canistropsis correia-araujoi =

Scientific classification
- Kingdom: Plantae
- Clade: Tracheophytes
- Clade: Angiosperms
- Clade: Monocots
- Clade: Commelinids
- Order: Poales
- Family: Bromeliaceae
- Genus: Canistropsis
- Species: C. correia-araujoi

Binomial name
- Canistropsis correia-araujoi (E.Pereira & Leme) Leme

Species of flowering plant

Canistropsis correia-araujoi is a species of flowering plant in the genus Canistropsis.

This bromeliad is endemic to the Atlantic Forest biome (Mata Atlantica Brasileira) within Rio de Janeiro (state) and São Paulo (state), located in southeastern Brazil.
