= Canistrum triangulare =

Scientific classification
- Kingdom: Plantae
- Clade: Tracheophytes
- Clade: Angiosperms
- Clade: Monocots
- Clade: Commelinids
- Order: Poales
- Family: Bromeliaceae
- Genus: Canistrum
- Species: C. triangulare

Binomial name
- Canistrum triangulare L.B.Sm. & Reitz

Species of flowering plant

Canistrum triangulare is a plant species in the genus Canistrum. This species is endemic to Brazil.

== Cultivars ==
- Canistrum 'Black Sands'
- Canistrum 'Flare'
- × Canmea 'Tropic Beauty'
- × Canmea 'Wild Leopard'
- × Canmea 'Wild Tiger'
