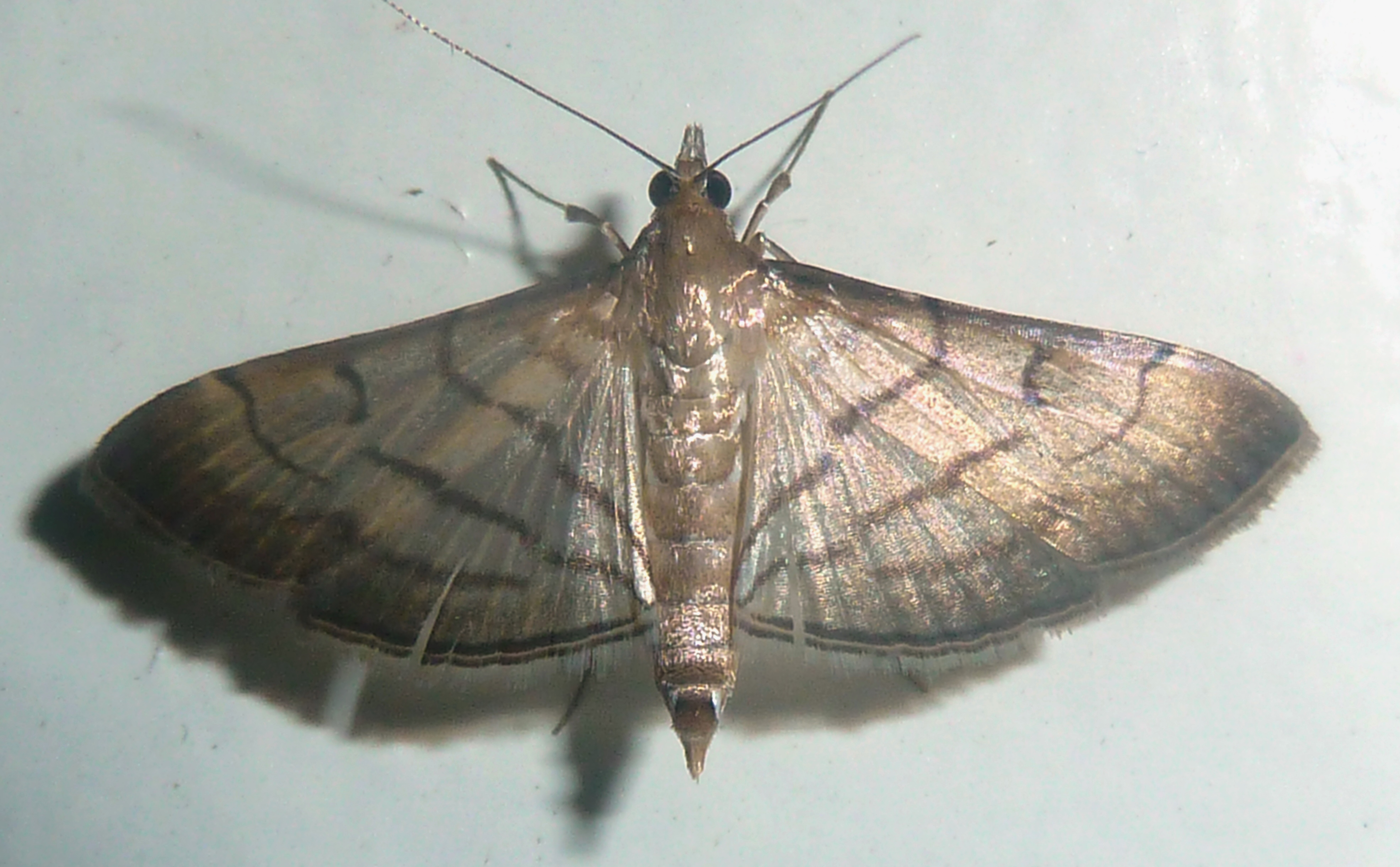

Scientific classification
- Kingdom: Animalia
- Phylum: Arthropoda
- Clade: Pancrustacea
- Class: Insecta
- Order: Lepidoptera
- Family: Crambidae
- Genus: Cnaphalocrocis
- Species: C. trapezalis

Binomial name
- Cnaphalocrocis trapezalis (Guenée, 1854)

Synonyms
- Salbia trapezalis Guenée, 1854; Bradina andresi Rebel, 1912; Cnaphalocrocis bifurcalis Snellen, 1880; Botys convectalis Walker, 1866; Botys creonalis Walker, 1859; Botys neoclesalis Walker, 1859; Dolichosticha perinephes Meyrick, 1886; Botys suspicalis Walker, 1859

= Cnaphalocrocis trapezalis =

Species of moth

Cnaphalocrocis trapezalis is a species of moth of the family Crambidae described by Achille Guenée in 1854. It can be found from Africa to the Pacific region, including Australia as well as in the Dominican Republic, Mexico and Peru.

== Nutrition ==
They feed on grasses (Poaceae). Known host plants include Zea mays, Sorghum species, Panicum trichocladum and Oryza species.
