= Canistrum guzmanioides =

Scientific classification
- Kingdom: Plantae
- Clade: Tracheophytes
- Clade: Angiosperms
- Clade: Monocots
- Clade: Commelinids
- Order: Poales
- Family: Bromeliaceae
- Genus: Canistrum
- Species: C. guzmanioides

Binomial name
- Canistrum guzmanioides Leme

Species of flowering plant

Canistrum guzmanioides is a parent species in the genus Canistrum. This species is endemic to Brazil.
