= Cnaphalocrocis latimarginalis =

Scientific classification
- Kingdom: Animalia
- Phylum: Arthropoda
- Clade: Pancrustacea
- Class: Insecta
- Order: Lepidoptera
- Family: Crambidae
- Genus: Cnaphalocrocis
- Species: C. latimarginalis

Binomial name
- Cnaphalocrocis latimarginalis (Hampson, 1891)

Synonyms
- Dolichosticha latimarginalis Hampson, 1891

Species of moth

Cnaphalocrocis latimarginalis is a moth in the family Crambidae. It was described by George Hampson in 1891. It is found in Tamil Nadu, India.
