= Cnaphalocrocis pauperalis =

Scientific classification
- Kingdom: Animalia
- Phylum: Arthropoda
- Clade: Pancrustacea
- Class: Insecta
- Order: Lepidoptera
- Family: Crambidae
- Genus: Cnaphalocrocis
- Species: C. pauperalis

Binomial name
- Cnaphalocrocis pauperalis (Strand, 1918)

Synonyms
- Marasmia pauperalis Strand, 1918

Species of moth

Cnaphalocrocis pauperalis is a moth in the family Crambidae. It was described by Strand in 1918. It is found in Taiwan.
