= Cnaphalocrocis cochrusalis =

Scientific classification
- Kingdom: Animalia
- Phylum: Arthropoda
- Clade: Pancrustacea
- Class: Insecta
- Order: Lepidoptera
- Family: Crambidae
- Genus: Cnaphalocrocis
- Species: C. cochrusalis

Binomial name
- Cnaphalocrocis cochrusalis (Walker, 1859)

Synonyms
- Hydrocampa cochrusalis Walker, 1859; Marasmia cochrusalis; Botys azionalis Walker, 1859; Botys ruptalis Walker, [1866]; Cnaphalocrocis ruptalis; Cnaphalocrocis perpersalis Möschler, 1890

Species of moth

Cnaphalocrocis cochrusalis, the marasmia moth, is a moth in the family Crambidae. It is found in the West Indies (including Puerto Rico, Cuba and the Dominican Republic), Costa Rica, Honduras and the United States, where it has been recorded from Florida, Louisiana, Mississippi, Oklahoma, South Carolina and Texas.

The forewings are whitish cinereous with dark brown interior and exterior lines, a brown submarginal line and a dark brown marginal line. Adults have been recorded on wing year-round in Florida.
