= Cnaphalocrocis sordidalis =

Scientific classification
- Kingdom: Animalia
- Phylum: Arthropoda
- Clade: Pancrustacea
- Class: Insecta
- Order: Lepidoptera
- Family: Crambidae
- Genus: Cnaphalocrocis
- Species: C. sordidalis

Binomial name
- Cnaphalocrocis sordidalis (Rothschild, 1915)

Synonyms
- Marasmia sordidalis Rothschild, 1915; Syngamia sordidalis

Species of moth

Cnaphalocrocis sordidalis is a moth in the family Crambidae. It was described by Rothschild in 1915. It is found on Seram.
