= Canistrum fosterianum =

Scientific classification
- Kingdom: Plantae
- Clade: Tracheophytes
- Clade: Angiosperms
- Clade: Monocots
- Clade: Commelinids
- Order: Poales
- Family: Bromeliaceae
- Genus: Canistrum
- Species: C. fosterianum

Binomial name
- Canistrum fosterianum L.B.Sm.

Species of flowering plant

Canistrum fosterianum is a plant species in the genus Canistrum. This species is named for Mulford B. Foster. This species is endemic to Brazil.

== Cultivars ==
- Canistrum 'Big Emma'
- Canistrum 'Flare'
- × Canmea 'Blue Tags'
- × Canmea 'FDTroll'
- × Canmea 'Galaxy'
- × Canmea 'Inci'
- × Canmea 'Jaspe'
- × Canmea 'Majo'
- × Canmea 'Smokey'
- × Quesistrum 'Claudia'
