= Cnaphalocrocis subvenilialis =

Scientific classification
- Kingdom: Animalia
- Phylum: Arthropoda
- Clade: Pancrustacea
- Class: Insecta
- Order: Lepidoptera
- Family: Crambidae
- Genus: Cnaphalocrocis
- Species: C. subvenilialis

Binomial name
- Cnaphalocrocis subvenilialis (Snellen, 1895)

Synonyms
- Dolichosticha subvenilialis Snellen, 1895

Species of moth

Cnaphalocrocis subvenilialis is a moth in the family Crambidae. It was described by Snellen in 1895. It is found on Java.
