= Cnaphalocrocis grisealis =

Scientific classification
- Kingdom: Animalia
- Phylum: Arthropoda
- Clade: Pancrustacea
- Class: Insecta
- Order: Lepidoptera
- Family: Crambidae
- Genus: Cnaphalocrocis
- Species: C. grisealis

Binomial name
- Cnaphalocrocis grisealis (Ghesquière, 1942)

Synonyms
- Marasmia grisealis Ghesquière, 1942

Species of moth

Cnaphalocrocis grisealis is a moth in the family Crambidae. It was described by Jean Ghesquière in 1942. It is found in the former provinces of Équateur and Katanga in the Democratic Republic of the Congo.
