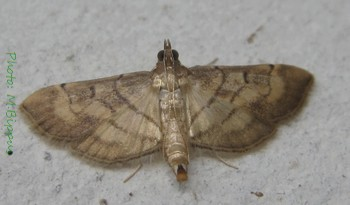

Scientific classification
- Kingdom: Animalia
- Phylum: Arthropoda
- Clade: Pancrustacea
- Class: Insecta
- Order: Lepidoptera
- Family: Crambidae
- Genus: Cnaphalocrocis
- Species: C. trebiusalis

Binomial name
- Cnaphalocrocis trebiusalis (Walker, 1859)

Synonyms
- Asopia trebiusalis Walker, 1859; Asopia socialis Walker, 1866

= Cnaphalocrocis trebiusalis =

Species of moth

Cnaphalocrocis trebiusalis is a species of moth of the family Crambidae. It can be found from Africa to south-east Asia.
