= Cnaphalocrocis conformis =

Scientific classification
- Kingdom: Animalia
- Phylum: Arthropoda
- Clade: Pancrustacea
- Class: Insecta
- Order: Lepidoptera
- Family: Crambidae
- Genus: Cnaphalocrocis
- Species: C. conformis

Binomial name
- Cnaphalocrocis conformis (Meyrick, 1934)

Synonyms
- Prodotaula conformis Meyrick, 1934; Marasmia conformis (Meyrick, 1934)

Species of moth

Cnaphalocrocis conformis is a moth in the family Crambidae. It was described by Edward Meyrick in 1934. It is found in the former provinces of Équateur and Katanga in the Democratic Republic of the Congo.
