= Canistropsis burchellii =

Scientific classification
- Kingdom: Plantae
- Clade: Tracheophytes
- Clade: Angiosperms
- Clade: Monocots
- Clade: Commelinids
- Order: Poales
- Family: Bromeliaceae
- Genus: Canistropsis
- Species: C. burchellii

Binomial name
- Canistropsis burchellii (Baker) Leme

Synonyms
- Aechmea burchellii Baker; Aregelia burchellii (Baker) Mez; Nidularium burchellii (Baker) Mez; Canistropsis simulans (E.Pereira & Leme) Leme; Cryptanthus emergens Lindm.; Nidularium emergens (Lindm.) Mez; Nidularium pubisepalum Mez; Nidularium simulans E.Pereira & Leme

Species of flowering plant

Canistropsis burchellii is a species of flowering plant in the genus Canistropsis.

This bromeliad is endemic to the Atlantic Forest biome (Mata Atlantica Brasileira) within São Paulo (state), located in southeastern Brazil.

== Cultivars and hybrids ==
- × Aechopsis 'Newk'
- × Neostropsis 'Fanfare'
- × Neostropsis 'Shadeball'
