= Cnaphalocrocis liliicola =

Scientific classification
- Kingdom: Animalia
- Phylum: Arthropoda
- Clade: Pancrustacea
- Class: Insecta
- Order: Lepidoptera
- Family: Crambidae
- Genus: Cnaphalocrocis
- Species: C. liliicola

Binomial name
- Cnaphalocrocis liliicola (Ghesquière, 1942)

Synonyms
- Marasmia liliicola Ghesquière, 1942

Species of moth

Cnaphalocrocis liliicola is a moth in the family Crambidae. It was described by Jean Ghesquière in 1942. It is found in North Kivu, Democratic Republic of the Congo.

The larvae feed on Kniphofia bequaerti.
