= Cnaphalocrocis iolealis =

Scientific classification
- Kingdom: Animalia
- Phylum: Arthropoda
- Clade: Pancrustacea
- Class: Insecta
- Order: Lepidoptera
- Family: Crambidae
- Genus: Cnaphalocrocis
- Species: C. iolealis

Binomial name
- Cnaphalocrocis iolealis (Walker, 1859)

Synonyms
- Botys iolealis Walker, 1859; Botys jolinalis Lederer, 1863

Species of moth

Cnaphalocrocis iolealis is a moth in the family Crambidae. It was described by Francis Walker in 1859. It is found in China and on Borneo.
