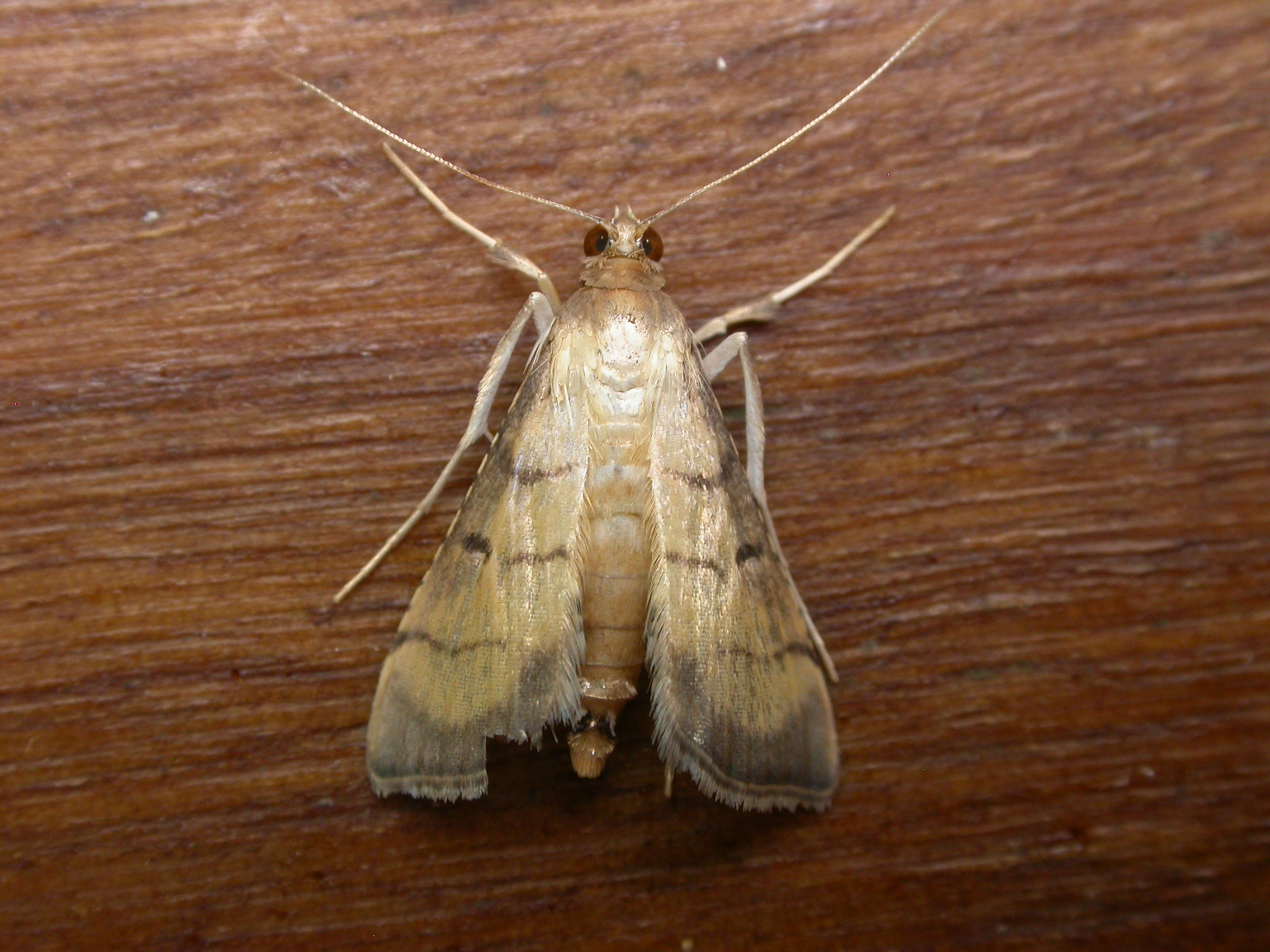

Scientific classification
- Kingdom: Animalia
- Phylum: Arthropoda
- Clade: Pancrustacea
- Class: Insecta
- Order: Lepidoptera
- Family: Crambidae
- Genus: Cnaphalocrocis
- Species: C. bilinealis

Binomial name
- Cnaphalocrocis bilinealis (Hampson, 1891)

Synonyms
- Dolichosticha bilinealis Hampson, 1891

= Cnaphalocrocis bilinealis =

Species of moth

Cnaphalocrocis bilinealis is a species of moth of the family Crambidae. It was described from India, but has also been recorded from Queensland in Australia, China, Malaysia, Sri Lanka and the Democratic Republic of the Congo.
