= Cnaphalocrocis fusifascialis =

Scientific classification
- Kingdom: Animalia
- Phylum: Arthropoda
- Clade: Pancrustacea
- Class: Insecta
- Order: Lepidoptera
- Family: Crambidae
- Genus: Cnaphalocrocis
- Species: C. fusifascialis

Binomial name
- Cnaphalocrocis fusifascialis (Hampson, 1896)

Synonyms
- Marasmia fusifascialis Hampson, 1896

Species of moth

Cnaphalocrocis fusifascialis is a moth in the family Crambidae. It was described by George Hampson in 1896. It is found in Sri Lanka.
