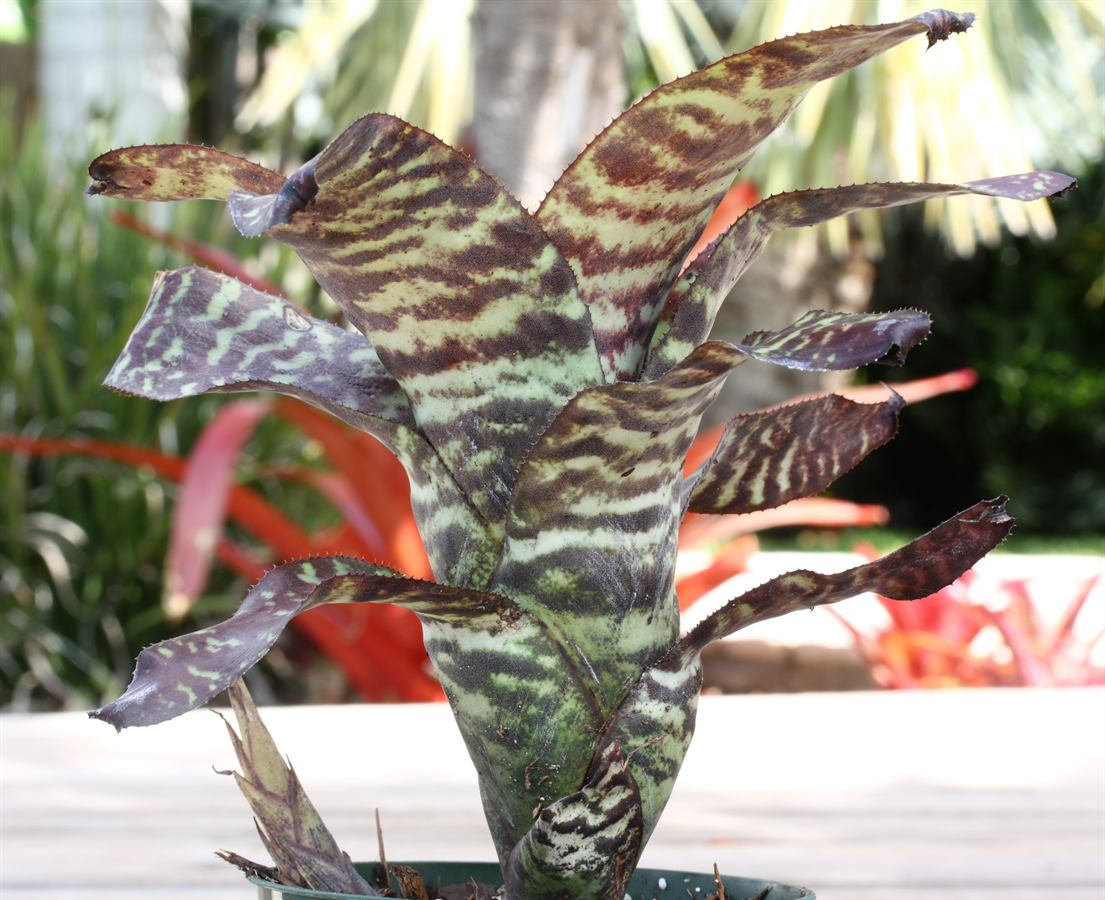

Scientific classification
- Kingdom: Plantae
- Clade: Tracheophytes
- Clade: Angiosperms
- Clade: Monocots
- Clade: Commelinids
- Order: Poales
- Family: Bromeliaceae
- Genus: Canistrum
- Species: C. seidelianum

Binomial name
- Canistrum seidelianum W.Weber

= Canistrum seidelianum =

Species of flowering plant

Canistrum seidelianum is a plant species in the genus Canistrum. This species is endemic to Brazil.

== Cultivars ==
- Canistrum 'Black Sands'
