= Cnaphalocrocis hemicrossa =

Scientific classification
- Kingdom: Animalia
- Phylum: Arthropoda
- Clade: Pancrustacea
- Class: Insecta
- Order: Lepidoptera
- Family: Crambidae
- Genus: Cnaphalocrocis
- Species: C. hemicrossa

Binomial name
- Cnaphalocrocis hemicrossa (Meyrick, 1887)

Synonyms
- Marasmia hemicrossa Meyrick, 1887

Species of moth

Cnaphalocrocis hemicrossa is a moth in the family Crambidae. It was described by Edward Meyrick in 1887. It is found in Tahiti.
