= Cnaphalocrocis didialis =

Scientific classification
- Kingdom: Animalia
- Phylum: Arthropoda
- Clade: Pancrustacea
- Class: Insecta
- Order: Lepidoptera
- Family: Crambidae
- Genus: Cnaphalocrocis
- Species: C. didialis

Binomial name
- Cnaphalocrocis didialis (Viette, 1958)

Synonyms
- Marasmia didialis Viette, 1958

Species of moth

Cnaphalocrocis didialis is a species of moth of the family Crambidae. It can be found in Madagascar .

Its wingspan is 19mm, with a length of the forewings of 9mm.

The holotype had been collected in 1954 near Périnet (Analamazoatra Reserve)
