= Canistrum pickelii =

Scientific classification
- Kingdom: Plantae
- Clade: Tracheophytes
- Clade: Angiosperms
- Clade: Monocots
- Clade: Commelinids
- Order: Poales
- Family: Bromeliaceae
- Genus: Canistrum
- Species: C. pickelii

Binomial name
- Canistrum pickelii (Andrade-Lima & L.B.Sm.) Leme & J.A.Siqueira

Species of flowering plant

Canistrum pickelii is a species of flowering plant in the genus Canistrum. This species is endemic to Brazil.
