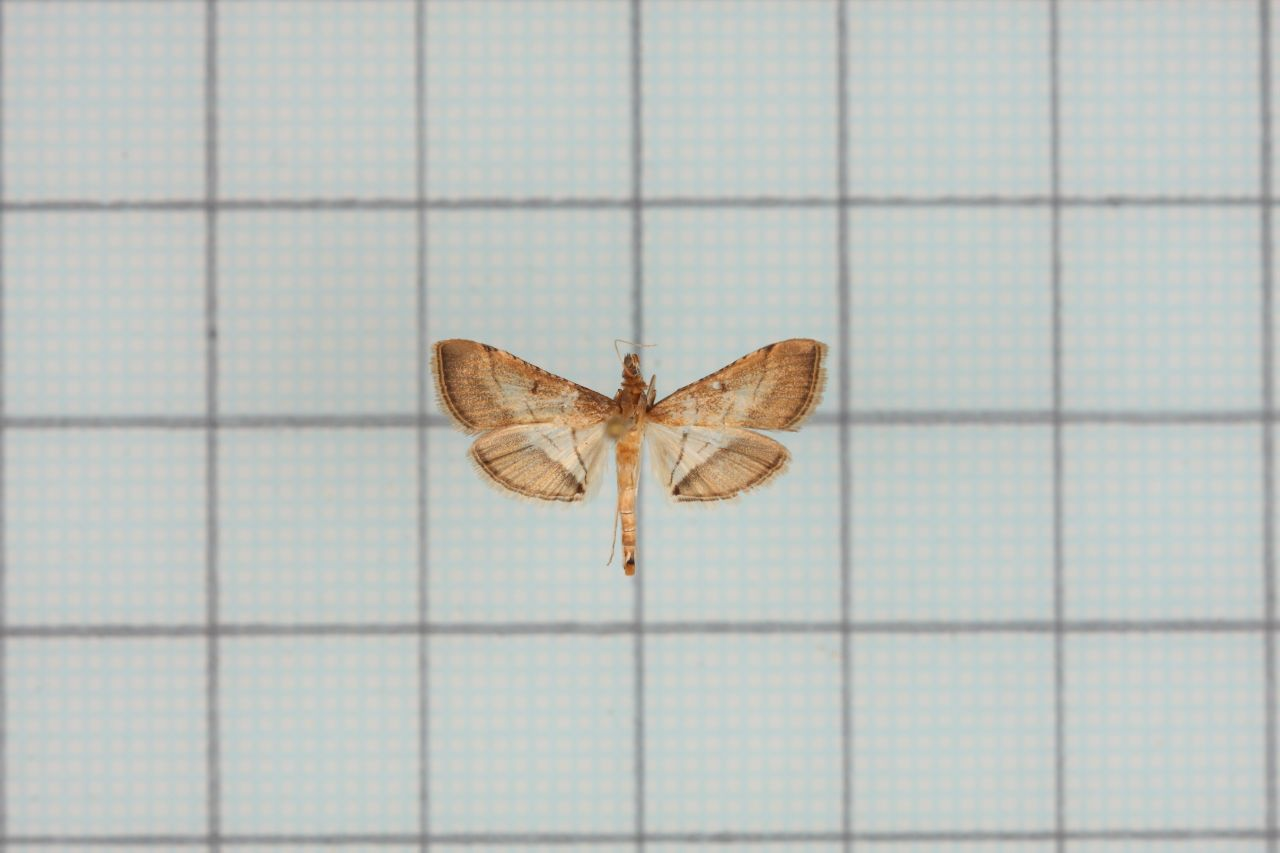

Scientific classification
- Kingdom: Animalia
- Phylum: Arthropoda
- Clade: Pancrustacea
- Class: Insecta
- Order: Lepidoptera
- Family: Crambidae
- Genus: Cnaphalocrocis
- Species: C. limbalis

Binomial name
- Cnaphalocrocis limbalis (Wileman, 1911)

Synonyms
- Marasmia limbalis Wileman, 1911

= Cnaphalocrocis limbalis =

Species of moth

Cnaphalocrocis limbalis is a moth of the family Crambidae described by Alfred Ernest Wileman in 1911. It is found in Taiwan and Japan.

The wingspan is 16–17 mm. Adults are on wing in February.
