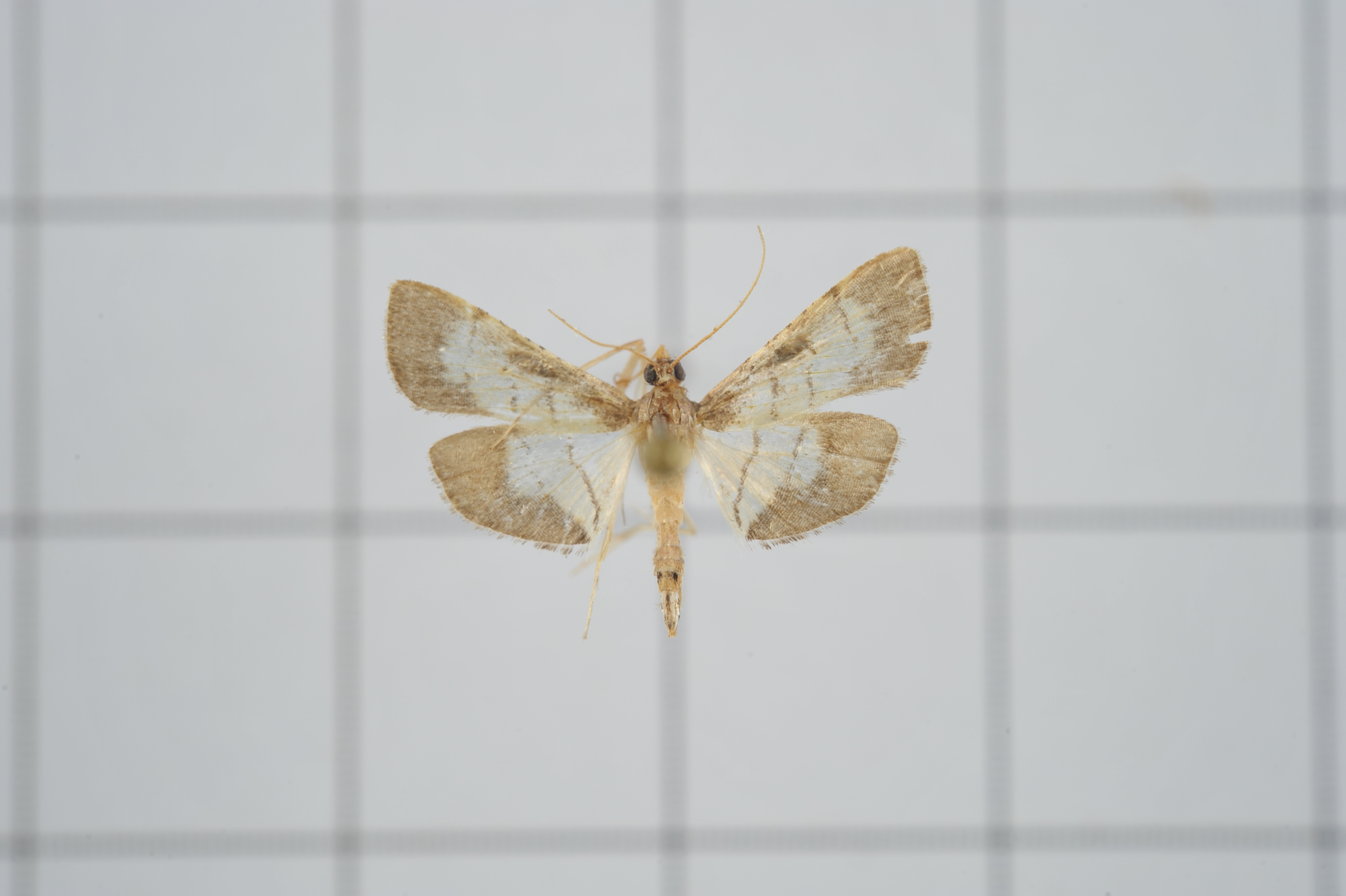

Scientific classification
- Kingdom: Animalia
- Phylum: Arthropoda
- Clade: Pancrustacea
- Class: Insecta
- Order: Lepidoptera
- Family: Crambidae
- Genus: Cnaphalocrocis
- Species: C. stereogona

Binomial name
- Cnaphalocrocis stereogona (Meyrick, 1886)

Synonyms
- Epimima stereogona Meyrick, 1886

= Cnaphalocrocis stereogona =

Species of moth

Cnaphalocrocis stereogona is a moth in the family Crambidae. It was described by Edward Meyrick in 1886. It is found on Fiji.

The wingspan is 15–16 mm. The forewings are pale whitish ochreous, irrorated (sprinkled) with fuscous grey towards the costa. The hindwings are ochreous whitish.
