= Canistropsis marceloi =

Scientific classification
- Kingdom: Plantae
- Clade: Tracheophytes
- Clade: Angiosperms
- Clade: Monocots
- Clade: Commelinids
- Order: Poales
- Family: Bromeliaceae
- Genus: Canistropsis
- Species: C. marceloi

Binomial name
- Canistropsis marceloi (E.Pereira & Moutinho) Leme

Species of flowering plant

Canistropsis marceloi is a species of flowering plant in the genus Canistropsis.

This bromeliad is endemic to the Atlantic Forest biome (Mata Atlantica Brasileira) within Rio de Janeiro (state), located in southeastern Brazil.
