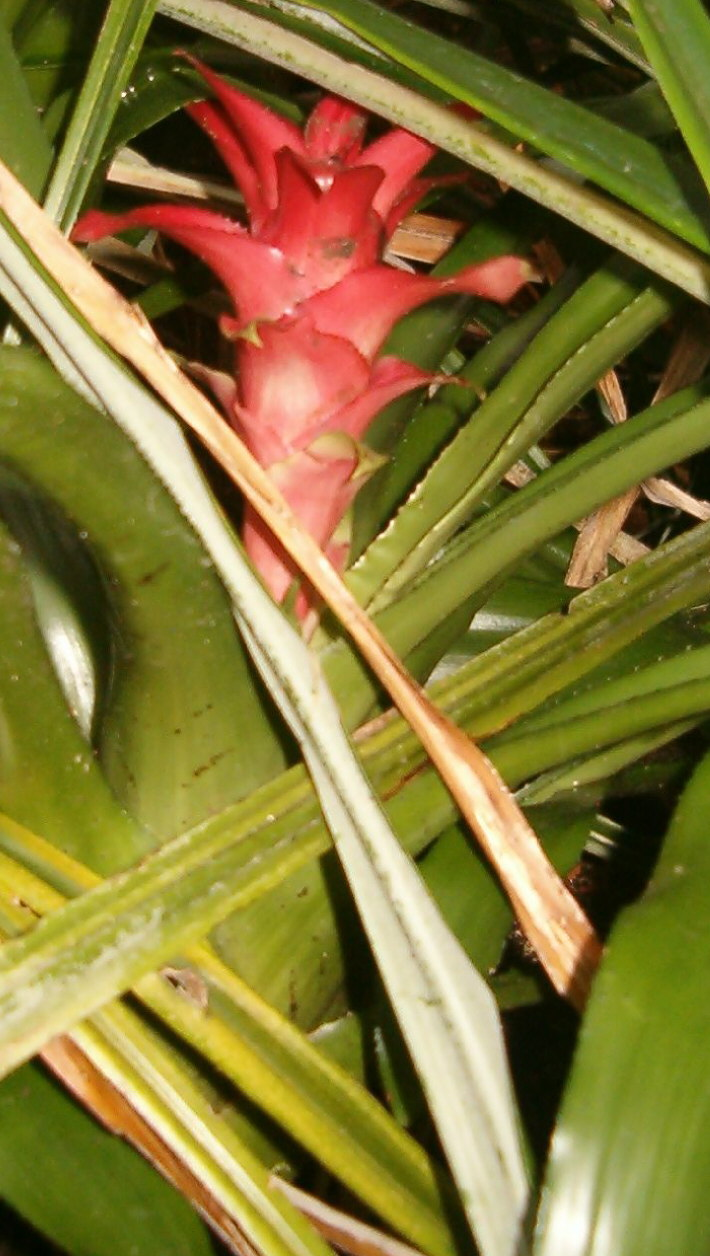

Scientific classification
- Kingdom: Plantae
- Clade: Embryophytes
- Clade: Tracheophytes
- Clade: Spermatophytes
- Clade: Angiosperms
- Clade: Monocots
- Clade: Commelinids
- Order: Poales
- Family: Bromeliaceae
- Genus: Canistropsis
- Species: C. microps

Binomial name
- Canistropsis microps (É.Morren ex Mez) Leme

Synonyms
- Homotypic Synonyms: Aregelia microps (É.Morren ex Mez) Mez; Nidularium microps É.Morren ex Mez; Heterotypic Synonyms: Canistropsis microps f. bicensis (Ule) Leme; Canistropsis microps f. pallida (L.B.Sm.) Leme; Nidularium angraense E.Pereira & Leme; Nidularium microcephalum Ule; Nidularium microcephalum var. bicense Ule; Nidularium microps f. acuminatum E.Pereira & Leme; Nidularium microps var. bicense (Ule) L.B.Sm.; Nidularium microps f. bicensis (Ule) E.Pereira & Leme; Nidularium microps f. pallidum (L.B.Sm.) E.Pereira & Leme; Nidularium microps var. pallidum L.B.Sm.

= Canistropsis microps =

Species of flowering plant

Canistropsis microps is a species of flowering plant in the family Bromeliaceae. This bromeliad is endemic to the Atlantic Forest biome (Mata Atlantica Brasileira) within Rio de Janeiro (state) and São Paulo (state), located in southeastern Brazil.
