= Cnaphalocrocis laticostalis =

Scientific classification
- Kingdom: Animalia
- Phylum: Arthropoda
- Clade: Pancrustacea
- Class: Insecta
- Order: Lepidoptera
- Family: Crambidae
- Genus: Cnaphalocrocis
- Species: C. laticostalis

Binomial name
- Cnaphalocrocis laticostalis (Hampson, 1912)

Synonyms
- Marasmia laticostalis Hampson, 1912

Species of moth

Cnaphalocrocis laticostalis is a moth in the family Crambidae. It was described by George Hampson in 1912. It is found on Java.
