= Cnaphalocrocis sanitalis =

Scientific classification
- Kingdom: Animalia
- Phylum: Arthropoda
- Clade: Pancrustacea
- Class: Insecta
- Order: Lepidoptera
- Family: Crambidae
- Genus: Cnaphalocrocis
- Species: C. sanitalis

Binomial name
- Cnaphalocrocis sanitalis Snellen, 1880

Species of moth

Cnaphalocrocis sanitalis is a moth in the family Crambidae. It was described by Snellen in 1880. It is found on Sumatra.
