= Cnaphalocrocis grucheti =

Scientific classification
- Kingdom: Animalia
- Phylum: Arthropoda
- Clade: Pancrustacea
- Class: Insecta
- Order: Lepidoptera
- Family: Crambidae
- Genus: Cnaphalocrocis
- Species: C. grucheti

Binomial name
- Cnaphalocrocis grucheti (Viette, 1976)

Synonyms
- Marasmia grucheti Viette, 1976

Species of moth

Cnaphalocrocis grucheti is a moth in the family Crambidae. It was described by Viette in 1976. It is found on La Réunion.
