= Cnaphalocrocis daisensis =

Scientific classification
- Kingdom: Animalia
- Phylum: Arthropoda
- Clade: Pancrustacea
- Class: Insecta
- Order: Lepidoptera
- Family: Crambidae
- Genus: Cnaphalocrocis
- Species: C. daisensis

Binomial name
- Cnaphalocrocis daisensis (Shibuya, 1929)

Synonyms
- Epimima daisensis Shibuya, 1929

Species of moth

Cnaphalocrocis daisensis is a moth in the family Crambidae. It was described by Shibuya in 1929. It is found in Japan, where it has been recorded from Mount Daisen on Honshu.
