= Cnaphalocrocis rutilalis =

Scientific classification
- Kingdom: Animalia
- Phylum: Arthropoda
- Clade: Pancrustacea
- Class: Insecta
- Order: Lepidoptera
- Family: Crambidae
- Genus: Cnaphalocrocis
- Species: C. rutilalis

Binomial name
- Cnaphalocrocis rutilalis (Walker, 1859)

Synonyms
- Botys rutilalis Walker, 1859

Species of moth

Cnaphalocrocis rutilalis is a moth in the family Crambidae. It was described by Francis Walker in 1859. It is found in Sri Lanka and India.
