= Canistropsis seidelii =

Scientific classification
- Kingdom: Plantae
- Clade: Tracheophytes
- Clade: Angiosperms
- Clade: Monocots
- Clade: Commelinids
- Order: Poales
- Family: Bromeliaceae
- Genus: Canistropsis
- Species: C. seidelii

Binomial name
- Canistropsis seidelii (L.B.Sm. & Reitz) Leme

Species of flowering plant

Canistropsis seidelii is a species of flowering plant in the genus Canistropsis.

This bromeliad is endemic to the Atlantic Forest biome (Mata Atlantica Brasileira) within Rio de Janeiro (state) and São Paulo (state), located in southeastern Brazil.
