= Cnaphalocrocis loxodesma =

Scientific classification
- Kingdom: Animalia
- Phylum: Arthropoda
- Clade: Pancrustacea
- Class: Insecta
- Order: Lepidoptera
- Family: Crambidae
- Genus: Cnaphalocrocis
- Species: C. loxodesma

Binomial name
- Cnaphalocrocis loxodesma (Turner, 1915)

Synonyms
- Marasmia loxodesma Turner, 1915

Species of moth

Cnaphalocrocis loxodesma is a moth in the family Crambidae. It was described by Turner in 1915. It is found in Australia, where it has been recorded from the Northern Territory.

The wingspan is about 14 mm. The forewings are whitish with some fuscous suffusion at the base and on the costal part of the disc. The lines are fuscous. The hindwings are as the forewings.
