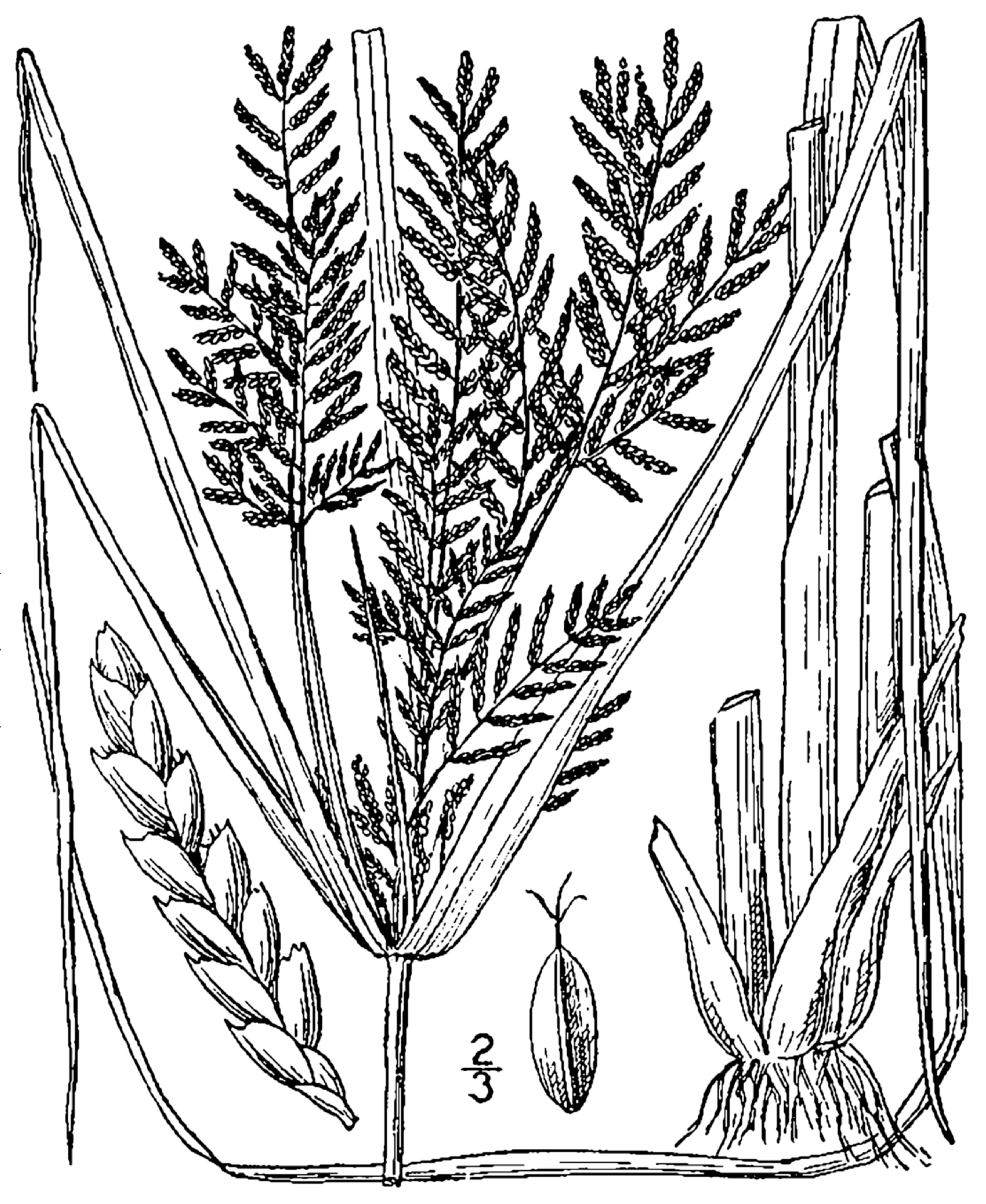

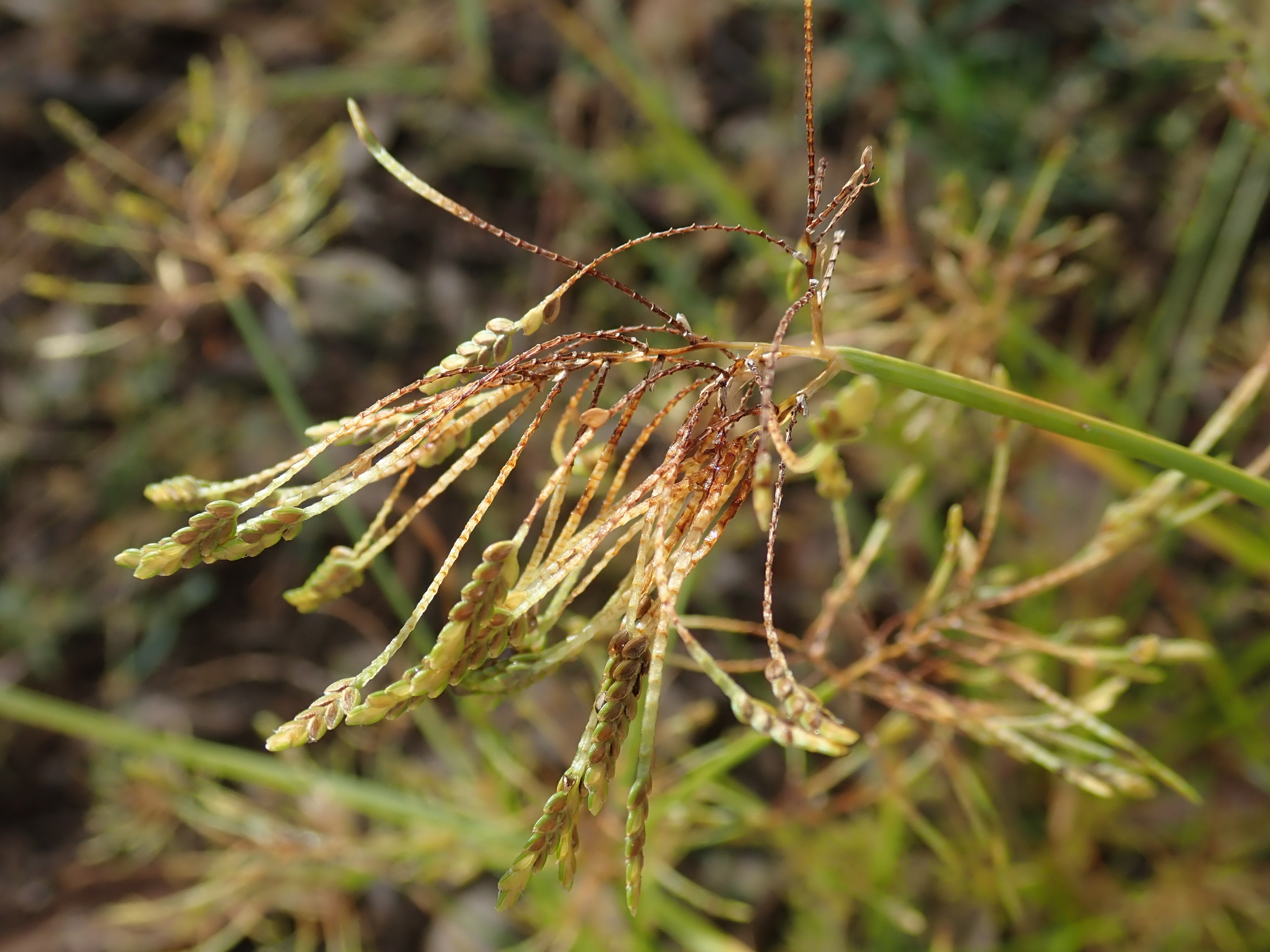

Scientific classification
- Kingdom: Plantae
- Clade: Tracheophytes
- Clade: Angiosperms
- Clade: Monocots
- Clade: Commelinids
- Order: Poales
- Family: Cyperaceae
- Genus: Cyperus
- Species: C. iria

Binomial name
- Cyperus iria L.

= Cyperus iria =

Rice flatsedge

Species of plant

Cyperus iria (also known as rice flat sedge and rice flatsedge) is a smooth, tufted sedge found worldwide. The roots are yellowish-red and fibrous. The plant often grows in rice paddies, where it is considered to be a weed.

== See also ==
- List of Cyperus species
