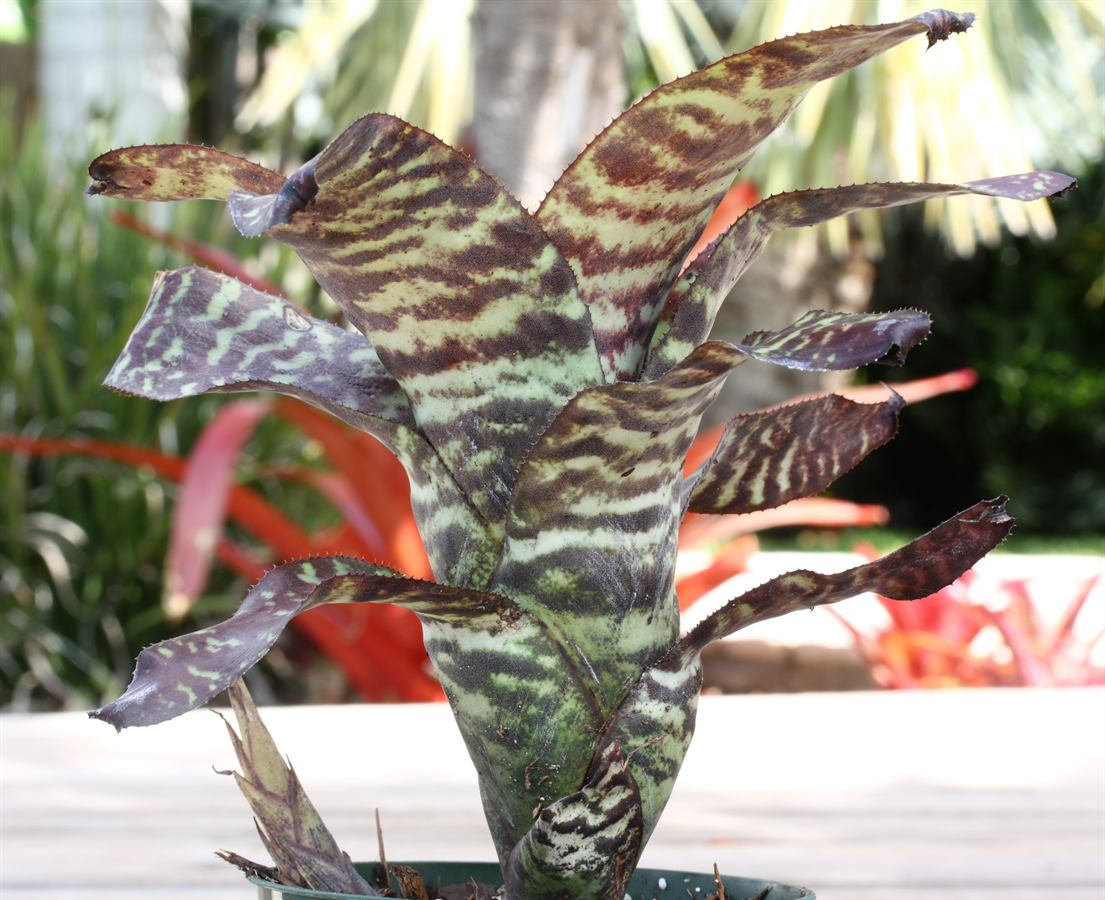

Scientific classification
- Kingdom: Plantae
- Clade: Tracheophytes
- Clade: Angiosperms
- Clade: Monocots
- Clade: Commelinids
- Order: Poales
- Family: Bromeliaceae
- Subfamily: Bromelioideae
- Genus: Canistrum; E.Morren

Synonyms
- Mosenia Lindm.; Wittrockia Lindm.; Edmundoa Leme

= Canistrum =

Genus of flowering plants

Canistrum is a genus of plants in the family Bromeliaceae, subfamily Bromelioideae.

The genus names are from the Greek “kanistron” (a kind of basket carried on the head).

This bromeliad genus is endemic to the Atlantic Forest biome (Mata Atlantica Brasileira), located in southeastern Brazil. There are currently 22 recognized species divided into two subgenera: Canistrum and Cucullatanthus Leme.

== Species ==
- Canistrum alagoanum Leme & J.A. Siqueira - Alagoas
- Canistrum ambiguum (Wand. & Leme) Wand. & B.A.Moreira - Rio de Janeiro, São Paulo
- Canistrum aurantiacum E. Morren - Alagoas, Pernambuco
- Canistrum auratum Leme - Bahia, Minas Gerais
- Canistrum camacaense Martinelli & Leme - Bahia
- Canistrum cyathiforme (Vell.) Mez - from Bahia to Santa Catarina
- Canistrum flavipetalum Wand. - Bahia
- Canistrum fosterianum L.B. Smith - Bahia
- Canistrum fragrans (Linden) Mabb
- Canistrum giganteum (Baker) L.B.Sm.
- Canistrum guzmanioides Leme - Bahia
- Canistrum improcerum Leme & J.A. Siqueira - Alagoas
- Canistrum lanigerum H. Luther & Leme - Bahia
- Canistrum montanum Leme - Bahia
- Canistrum paulistanum (Leme) Wand. & S.E.Martins - São Paulo
- Canistrum perplexum L.B.Sm. - São Paulo
- Canistrum pickelii (A. Lima & L.B. Smith) Leme & J.A. Siqueira - Pernambuco, Alagoas
- Canistrum sandrae Leme - Bahia
- Canistrum seidelianum W. Weber - Bahia
- Canistrum superbum (Lindm.) Mez - Rio de Janeiro to Santa Catarina
- Canistrum tenuisepalum (Leme) ined., - Minas Gerais
- Canistrum triangulare L.B. Smith & Reitz - Espírito Santo
