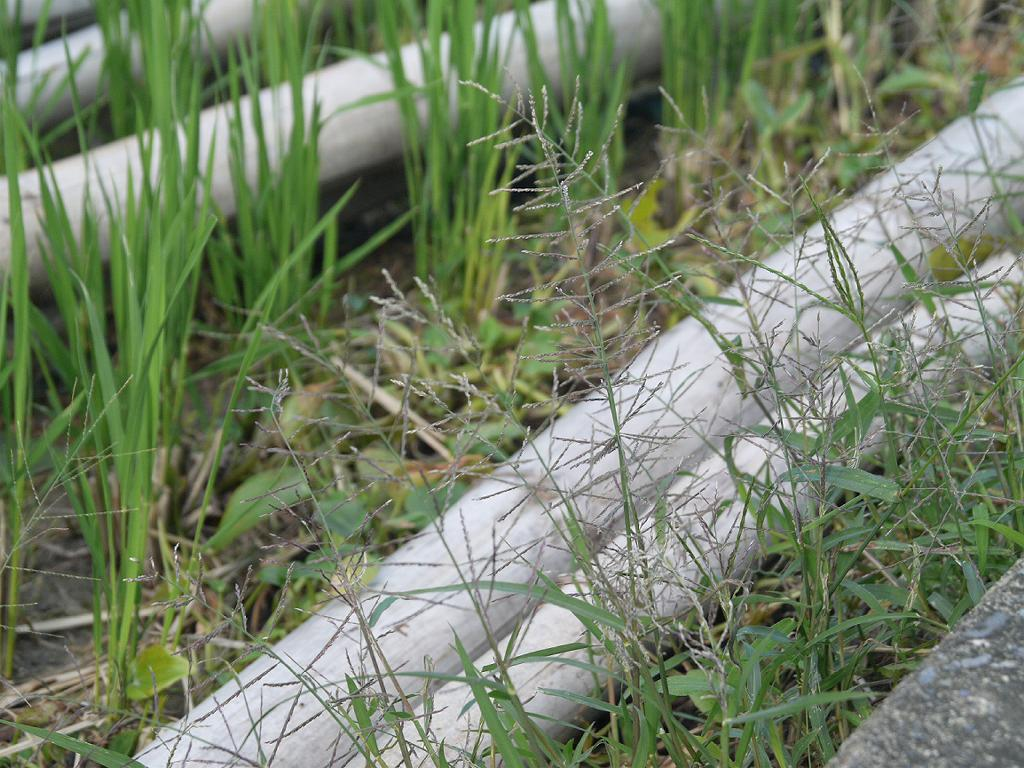

Scientific classification
- Kingdom: Plantae
- Clade: Tracheophytes
- Clade: Angiosperms
- Clade: Monocots
- Clade: Commelinids
- Order: Poales
- Family: Poaceae
- Subfamily: Chloridoideae
- Genus: Leptochloa
- Species: L. chinensis

Binomial name
- Leptochloa chinensis (L.) Nees

= Leptochloa chinensis =

Red sprangletop

Species of plant

Leptochloa chinensis, commonly known as red sprangletop, Asian sprangletop, or Chinese sprangletop, is a species of grass in the family Poaceae. It is a serious weed of rice.

It is native to regions of Africa, Asia, and Oceania. Places it is found include Japan, South Korea, Southeast Asia, Australia, Papua New Guinea, Eswatini, West Africa, Fiji and Samoa.

It is known to be a pasture grass and is a livestock grazing feed grass specialty, but in some cases it is a common rice weed. The 1889 book 'The Useful Native Plants of Australia’ records that it is "an excellent pasture grass, much relished by stock; it has tender panicles, and grows from two to three feet high. It is not endemic in Australia but is found in New South Wales and Queensland"

== Gallery ==
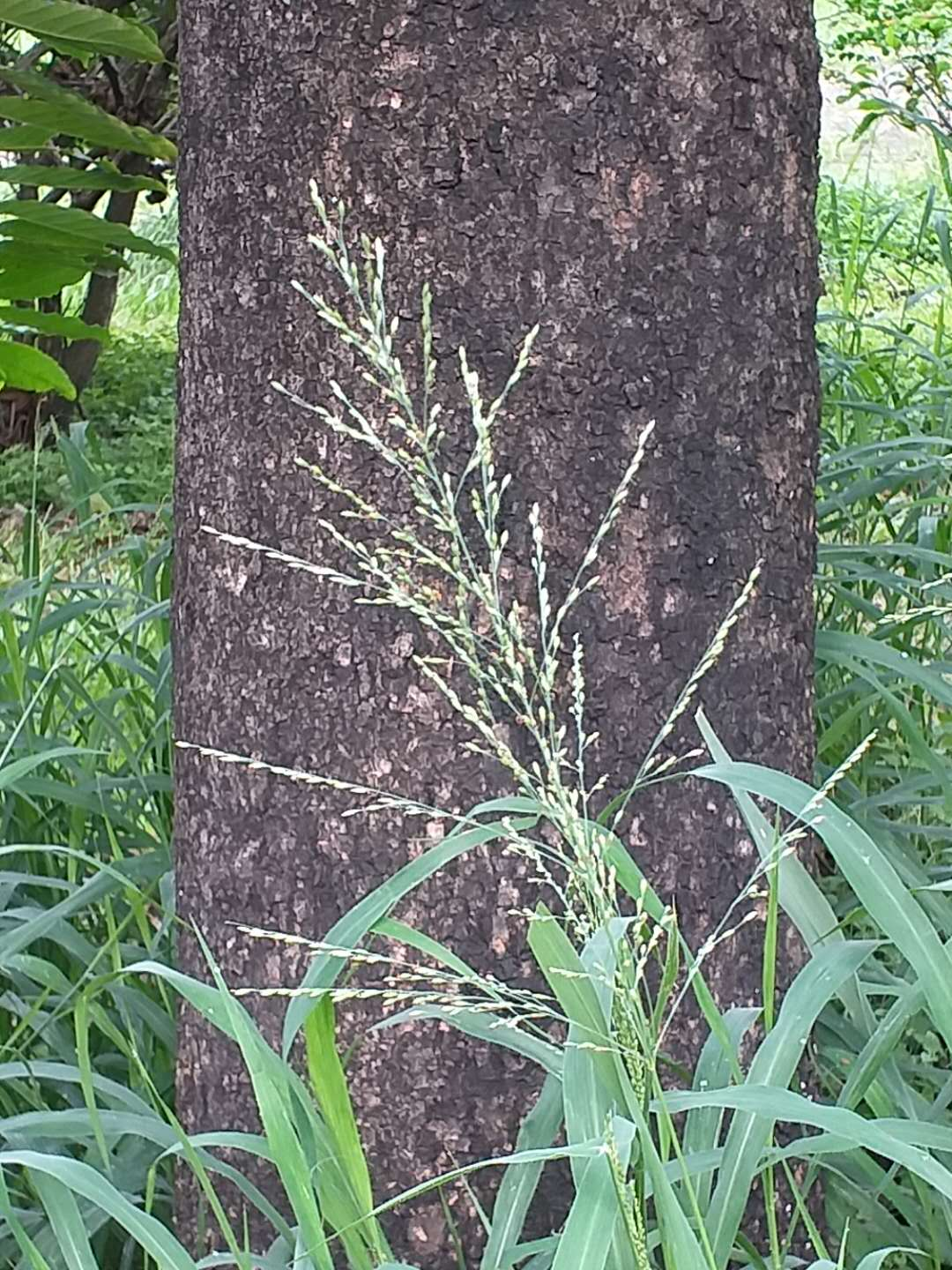

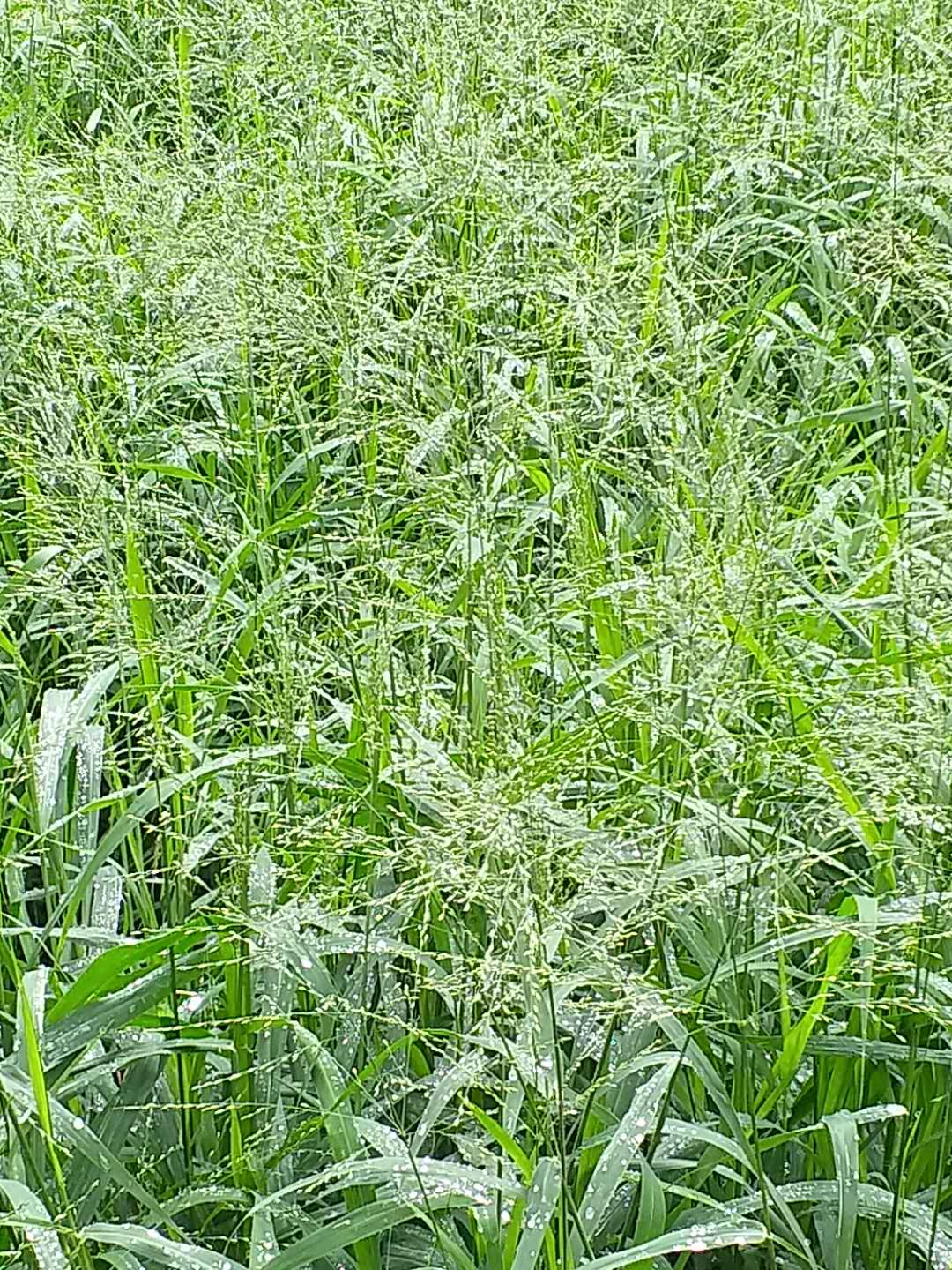
