= A. tinctoria =

A. tinctoria may refer to:

- Alkanna tinctoria, the alkanet or dyers' bugloss, a plant species
- Anchusa tinctoria, a plant species in the genus Anchusa
- Anthemis tinctoria, the golden marguerite or yellow chamomile, a plant species

== Synonyms ==
- Aechmea tinctoria, a synonym for Aechmea bromeliifolia

== See also ==
- Tinctoria
