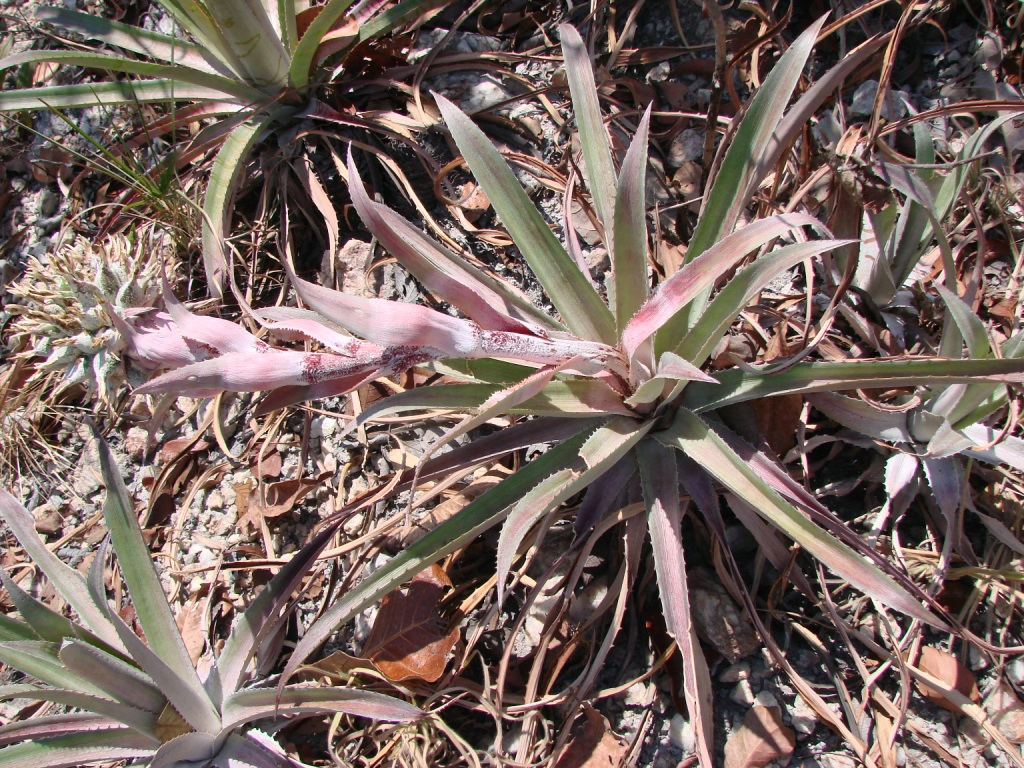

Scientific classification
- Kingdom: Plantae
- Clade: Embryophytes
- Clade: Tracheophytes
- Clade: Spermatophytes
- Clade: Angiosperms
- Clade: Monocots
- Clade: Commelinids
- Order: Poales
- Family: Bromeliaceae
- Genus: Aechmea
- Subgenus: Aechmea subg. Macrochordion
- Species: A. lamarchei

Binomial name
- Aechmea lamarchei Mez

Synonyms
- Homotypic Synonyms: Macrochordion lamarchei (Mez) L.B.Sm. & W.J.Kress; Heterotypic Synonyms: Aechmea chlorophylla L.B.Sm.; Aechmea lagenaria Mez; Macrochordion chlorophylla (L.B.Sm.) L.B.Sm. & W.J.Kress; Macrochordion lagenarium É.Morren ex Mez; Macrochordion lamarckii É.Morren ex Baker

= Aechmea lamarchei =

Species of flowering plant

Aechmea lamarchei is a species of flowering plant in the family Bromeliaceae. It is endemic to the eastern Brazilian states Minas Gerais and Espírito Santo.

== Cultivars ==
- Aechmea 'Fulgo-Lamarchei'
