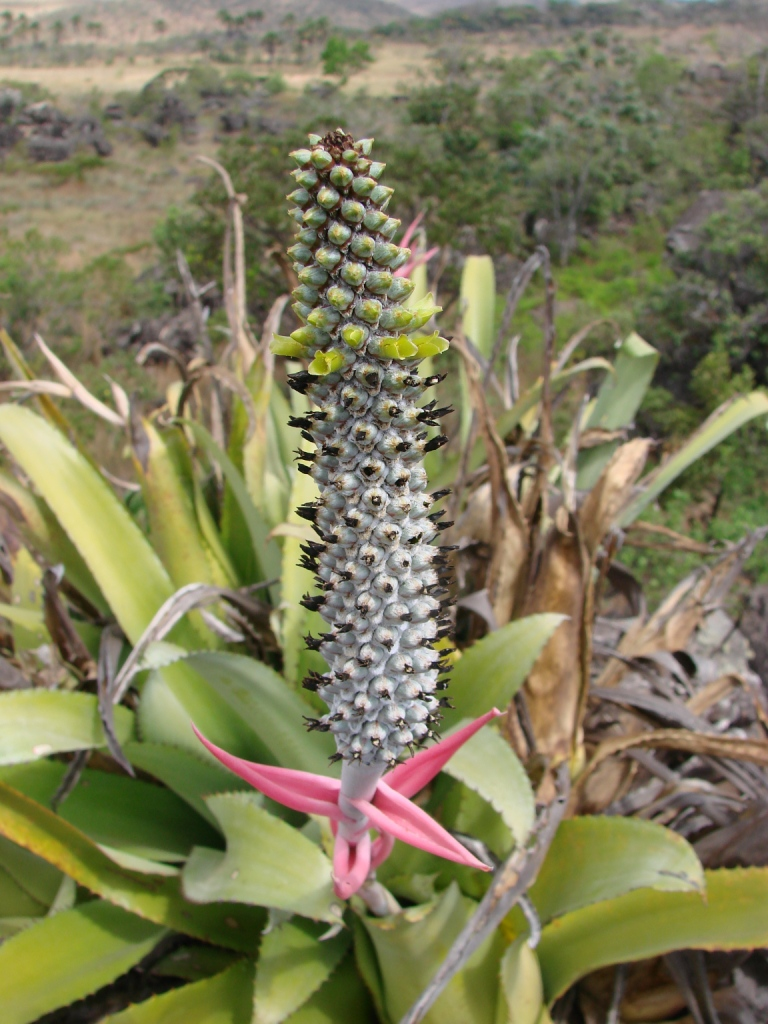
- Aechmea bromeliifolia at the Pirineus State Park, Pirenópolis, Goiás, Brazil

Scientific classification
- Kingdom: Plantae
- Clade: Tracheophytes
- Clade: Angiosperms
- Clade: Monocots
- Clade: Commelinids
- Order: Poales
- Family: Bromeliaceae
- Genus: Aechmea
- Subgenus: Aechmea subg. Macrochordion (de Vriese) Baker

Species
- See text

= Aechmea subg. Macrochordion =

Subgenus of flowering plants

Macrochordion is a subgenus of the genus Aechmea.

== Species ==
Species accepted by Encyclopedia of Bromeliads as of October 2022:

Image	Scientific name	Distribution
	Aechmea alba Mez	Brazil.
	Aechmea bromeliifolia (Rudge) Baker ex Benth. & Hook.f.	northern Argentina
	Aechmea lamarchei (E.Morren ex Mez) Mez	Brazil( Minas Gerais and Espírito Santo)
	Aechmea maasii Gouda & W.Till	Brazil( Espírito Santo and Rio de Janeiro.)
	Aechmea maculata L.B.Sm.	Brazil (Minas Gerais)
	Aechmea triangularis L.B.Sm.	Brazil(Espírito Santo )
