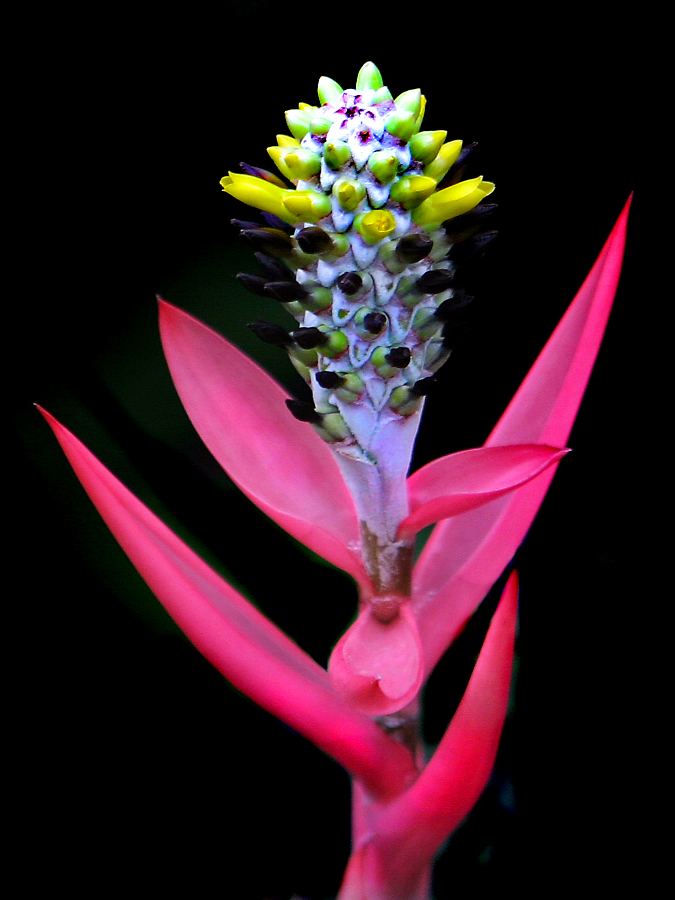
- Aechmea maculata growing under glass

Scientific classification
- Kingdom: Plantae
- Clade: Tracheophytes
- Clade: Angiosperms
- Clade: Monocots
- Clade: Commelinids
- Order: Poales
- Family: Bromeliaceae
- Genus: Aechmea
- Subgenus: Aechmea subg. Macrochordion
- Species: A. maculata

Binomial name
- Aechmea maculata L.B.Sm.

Synonyms
- Macrochordion maculata (L.B.Sm.) L.B.Sm. & W.J.Kress

= Aechmea maculata =

Species of flowering plant

Aechmea maculata is an evergreen plant species in the family Bromeliaceae and the genus Aechmea. It is endemic to the State of Minas Gerais in Brazil and is grown as an ornamental plant. It has yellow flowers and the ends of the bracts are sharply angled with a "v" shape.
