= Aechmea maasii =

Scientific classification
- Kingdom: Plantae
- Clade: Tracheophytes
- Clade: Angiosperms
- Clade: Monocots
- Clade: Commelinids
- Order: Poales
- Family: Bromeliaceae
- Genus: Aechmea
- Subgenus: Aechmea subg. Macrochordion
- Species: A. maasii

Binomial name
- Aechmea maasii Gouda & W.Till

Species of flowering plant

Aechmea maasii is a species in the genus Aechmea. This species is endemic to Brazil, known from the States of Espírito Santo and Rio de Janeiro.
