= Aechmea alba =

Scientific classification
- Kingdom: Plantae
- Clade: Tracheophytes
- Clade: Angiosperms
- Clade: Monocots
- Clade: Commelinids
- Order: Poales
- Family: Bromeliaceae
- Genus: Aechmea
- Subgenus: Aechmea subg. Macrochordion
- Species: A. alba

Binomial name
- Aechmea alba Mez

Synonyms
- Macrochordion alba (Mez) L.B.Sm. & W.J.Kress

Species of flowering plant

Aechmea alba is a species of flowering plant in the family Bromeliaceae. This species is endemic to Brazil.
