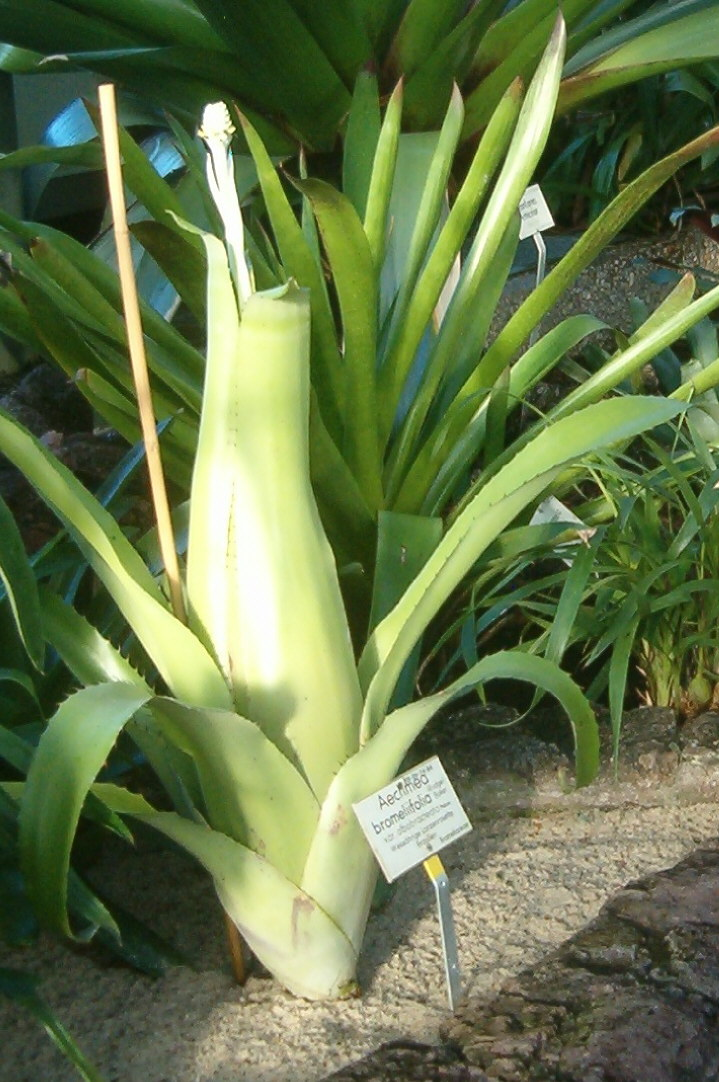

Scientific classification
- Kingdom: Plantae
- Clade: Tracheophytes
- Clade: Angiosperms
- Clade: Monocots
- Clade: Commelinids
- Order: Poales
- Family: Bromeliaceae
- Genus: Aechmea
- Species: A. bromeliifolia
- Variety: A. b. var. albobracteata

Trinomial name
- Aechmea bromeliifolia var. albobracteata Philcox

= Aechmea bromeliifolia var. albobracteata =

Variety of flowering plant

Aechmea bromeliifolia var. albobracteata is a plant in the genus Aechmea. This species is native to Brazil.

== Cultivars ==
- Aechmea 'Brillig'
