= Aechmea triangularis =

Scientific classification
- Kingdom: Plantae
- Clade: Tracheophytes
- Clade: Angiosperms
- Clade: Monocots
- Clade: Commelinids
- Order: Poales
- Family: Bromeliaceae
- Genus: Aechmea
- Subgenus: Aechmea subg. Macrochordion
- Species: A. triangularis

Binomial name
- Aechmea triangularis L.B.Sm.

Synonyms
- Macrochordion triangularis (L.B.Sm.) L.B.Sm. & W.J.Kress

Species of flowering plant

Aechmea triangularis is a plant species in the genus Aechmea. This species is endemic to the State of Espírito Santo in eastern Brazil.

== Cultivars ==
- Aechmea 'Red Bands'
