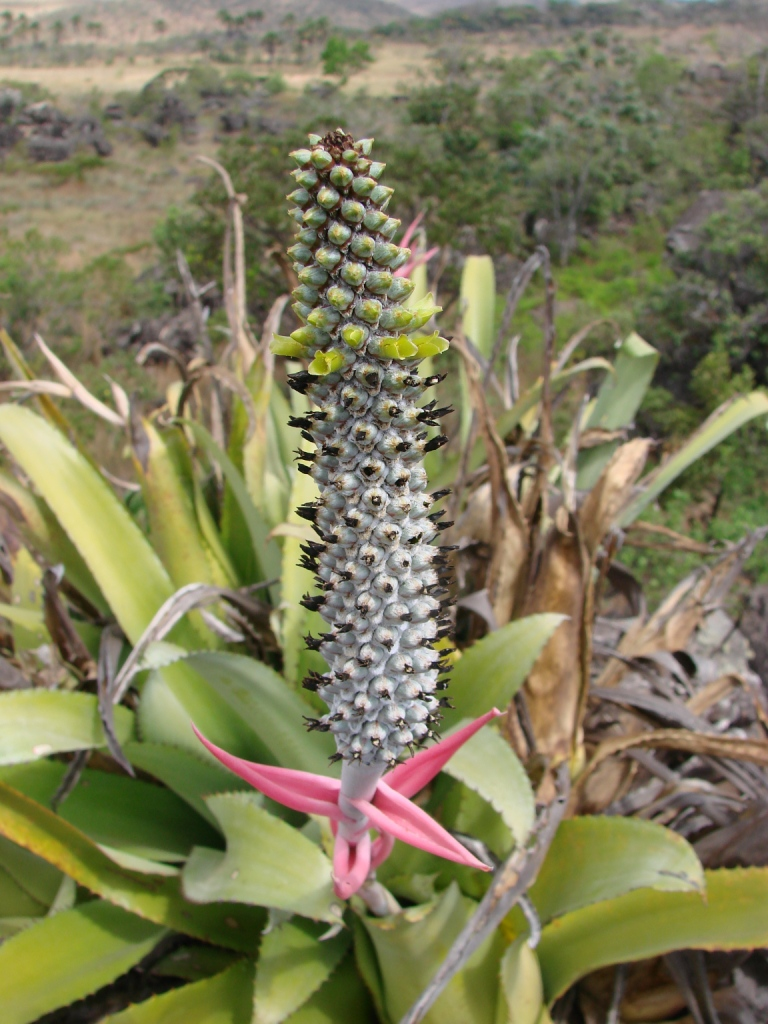

Scientific classification
- Kingdom: Plantae
- Clade: Tracheophytes
- Clade: Angiosperms
- Clade: Monocots
- Clade: Commelinids
- Order: Poales
- Family: Bromeliaceae
- Genus: Aechmea
- Subgenus: Aechmea subg. Macrochordion
- Species: A. bromeliifolia

Binomial name
- Aechmea bromeliifolia (Rudge) Baker

Varieties
- Aechmea bromeliifolia var. albobracteata; Aechmea bromeliifolia var. bromeliifolia

Synonyms
- Tillandsia bromeliifolia Rudge; Macrochordion bromeliifolium (Rudge) Beer; Hoiriri bromeliifolia (Rudge) Kuntze

= Aechmea bromeliifolia =

Species of plant

Aechmea bromeliifolia is a bromeliad native to southern Mexico, Central America, Trinidad, and South America as far south as northern Argentina.

== Description ==
Aechmea bromeliifolia can be found growing on the ground or as an epiphyte both in hot jungles and in arid regions at an altitude of up to 2,500 feet. It grows bright green leaves that have prominent spines and a bottle-shaped rosette. The branched inflorescence bears red bracts with greenish-yellow petals; the flowers are followed by black berries that are considered edible. The red form of this plant is sometimes sold as Aechmea Schiedeana.

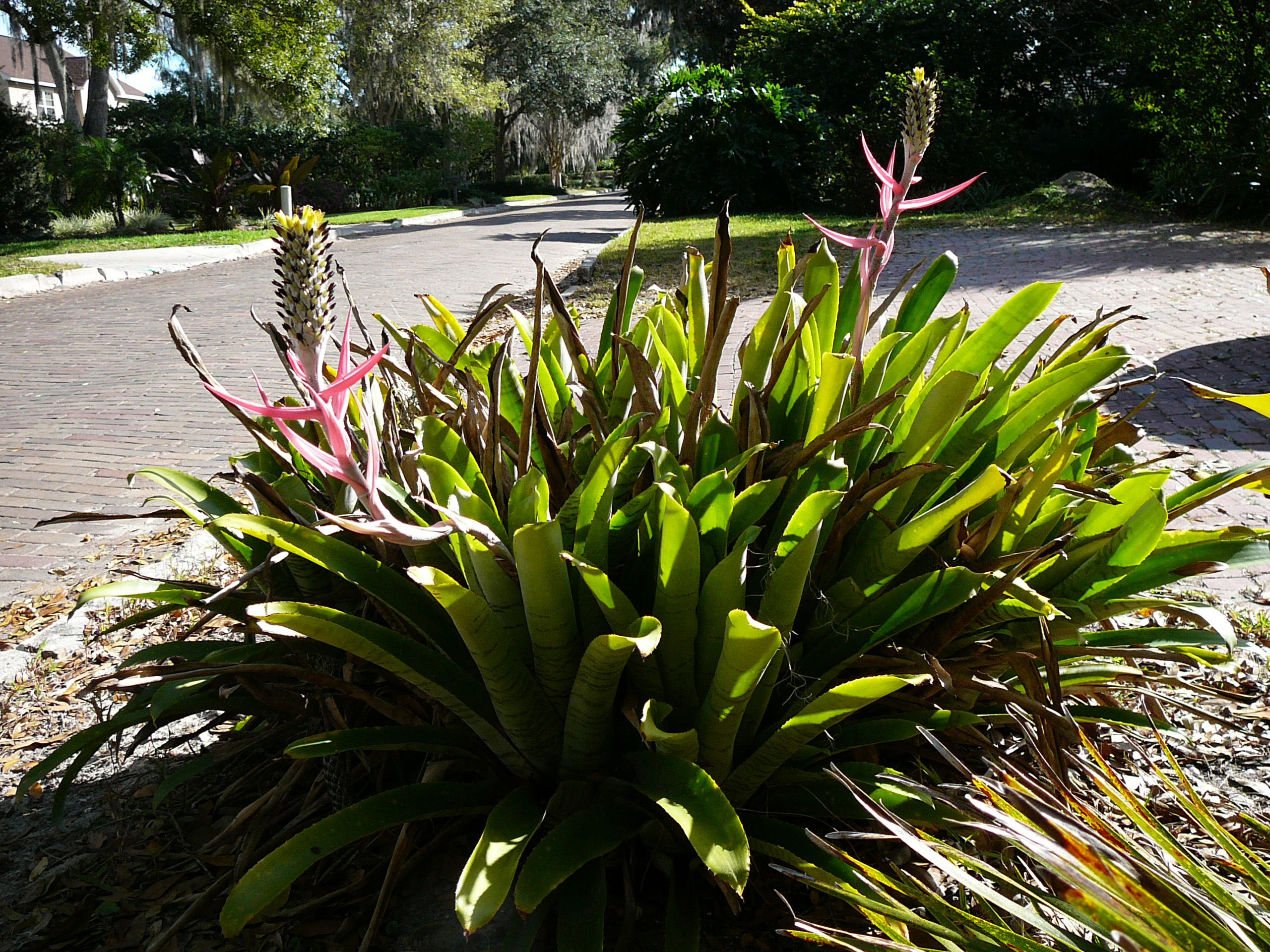
Aechmea Bromeliifolia

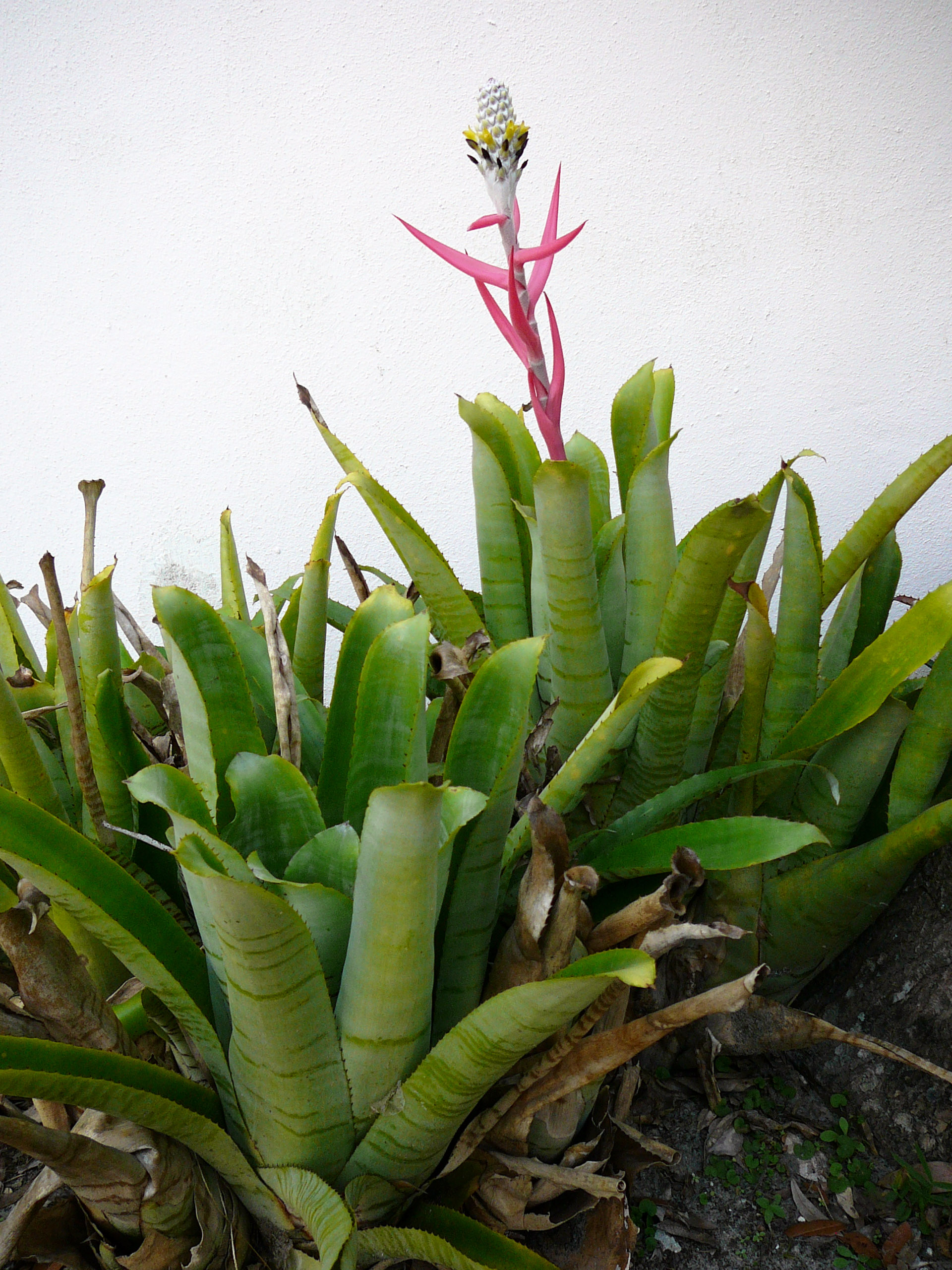
Aechmea Bromeliifolia

== Cultivars ==
- Aechmea 'Crossbands'
