= List of Guzmania species =

As of June 2023, Plants of the World Online recognized 211 species in the genus Guzmania, including hybrids:

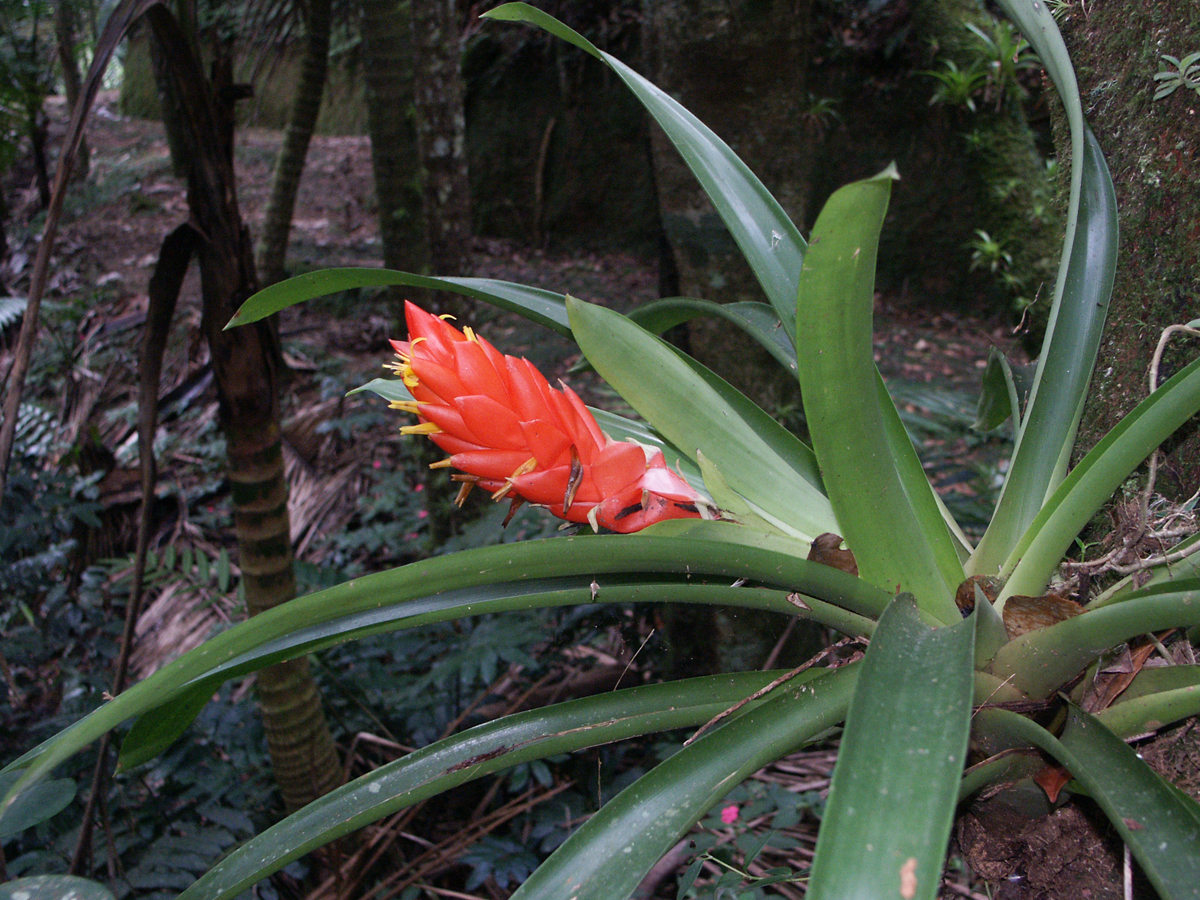
Guzmania berteroniana

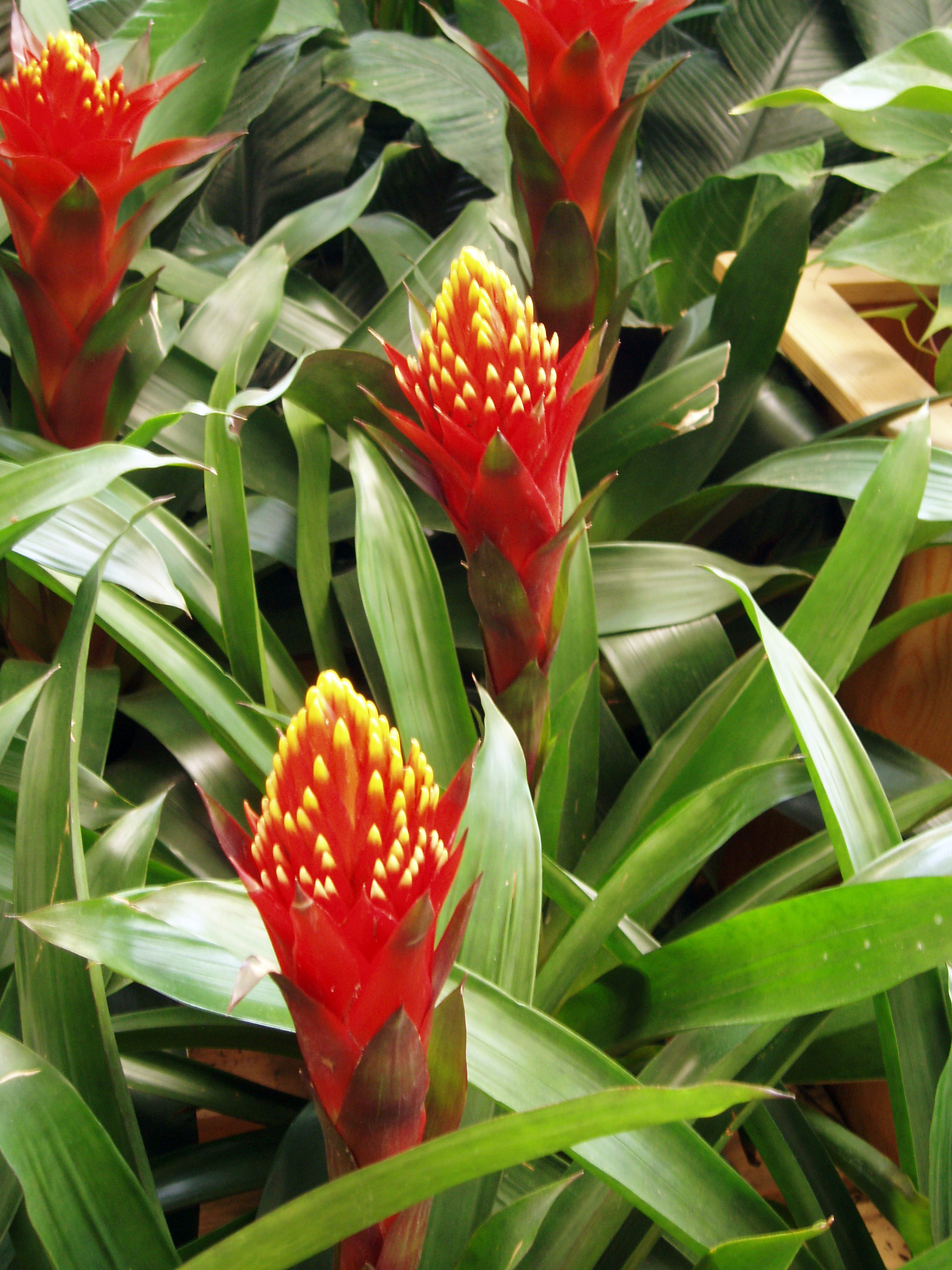
G. conifera

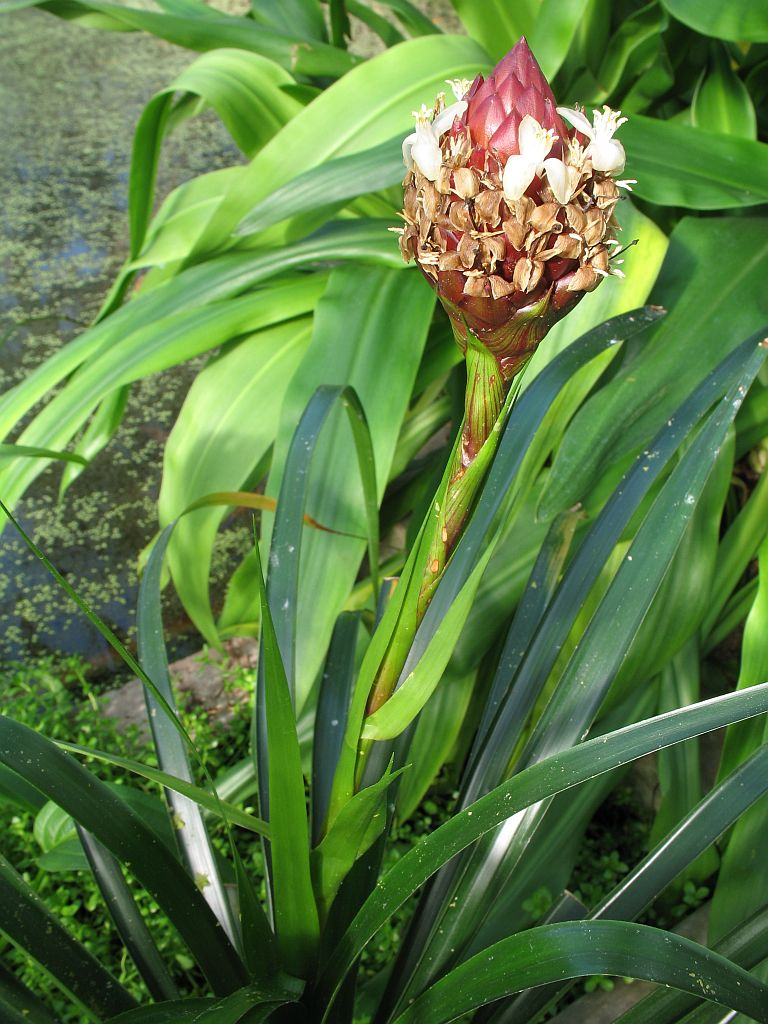
Guzmania farciminiformis

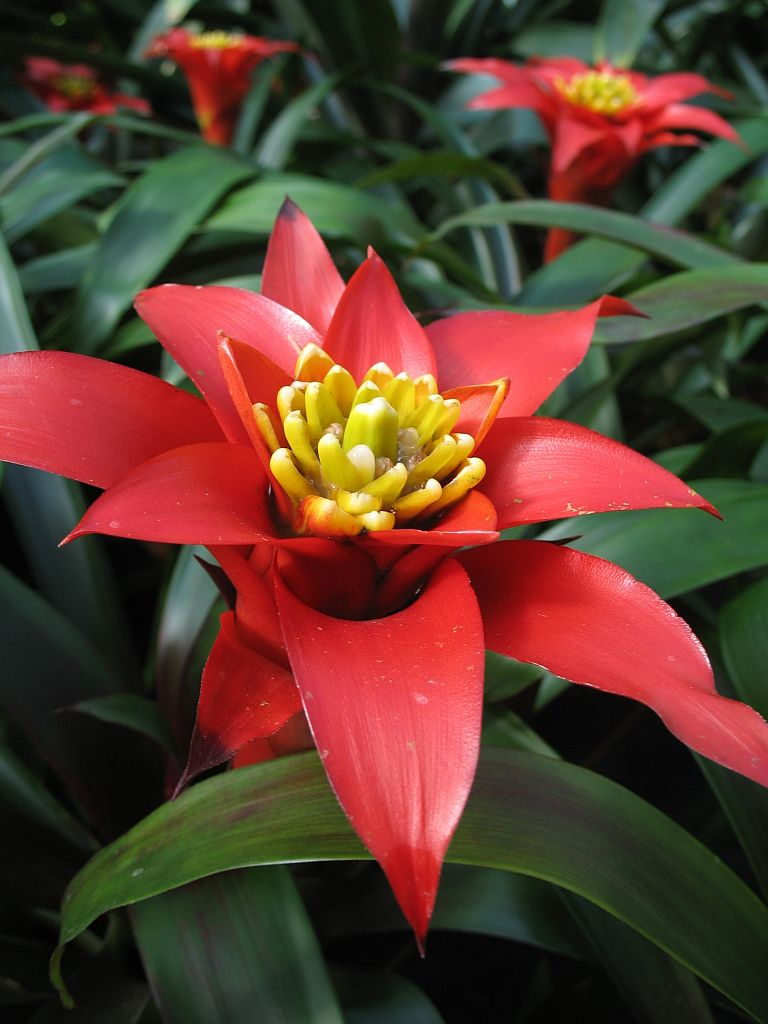
G. lingulata

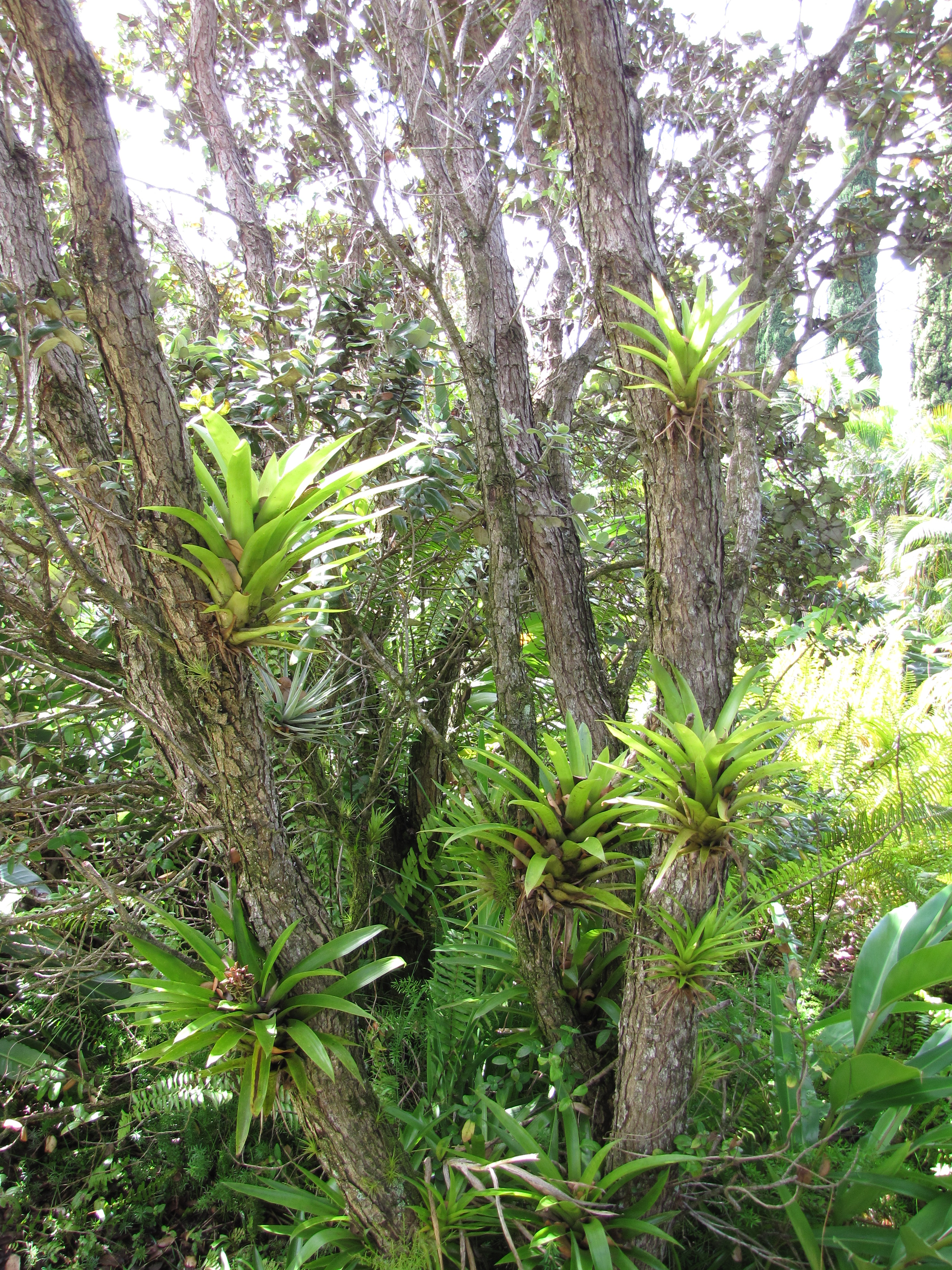
A photo of Guzmania monostachia at the Enchanting Floral Gardens of Kula, Maui

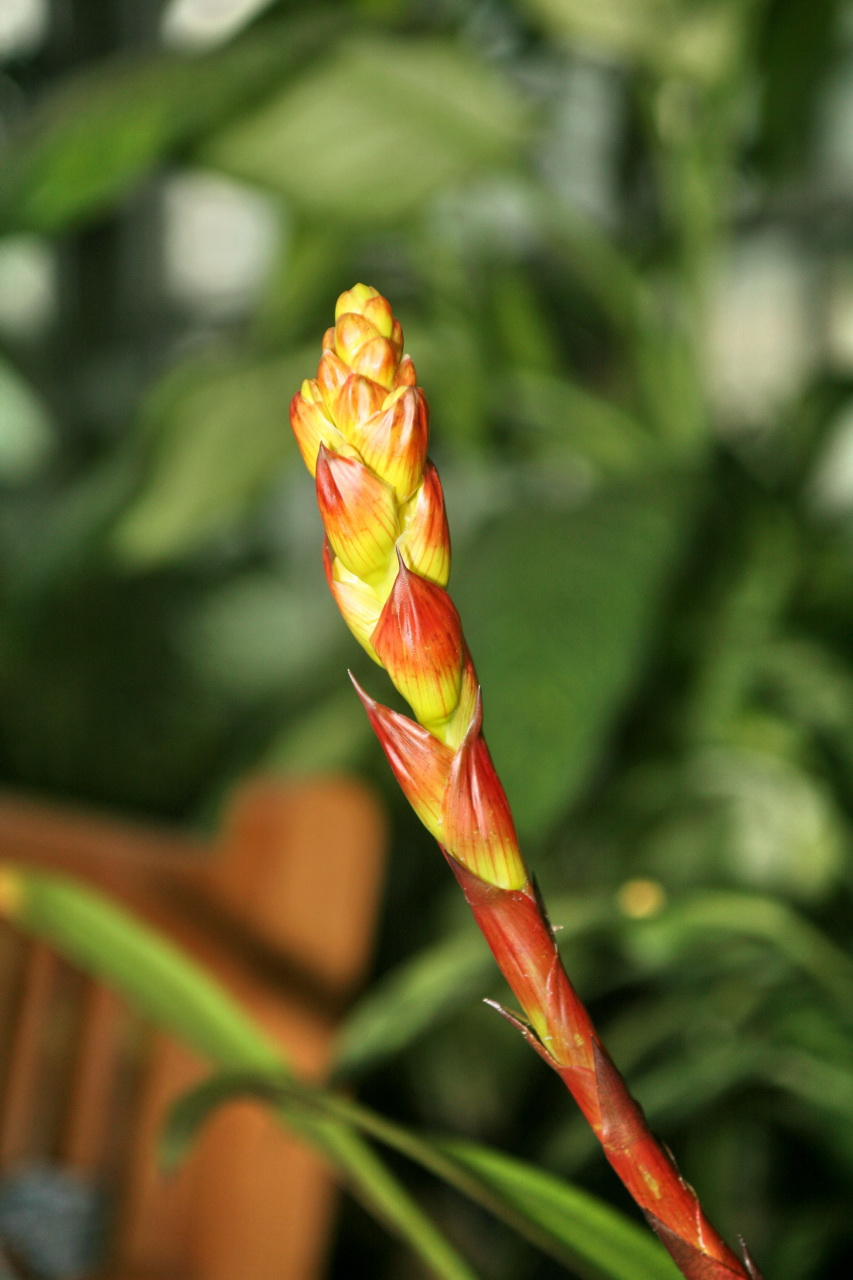
Guzmania musaica

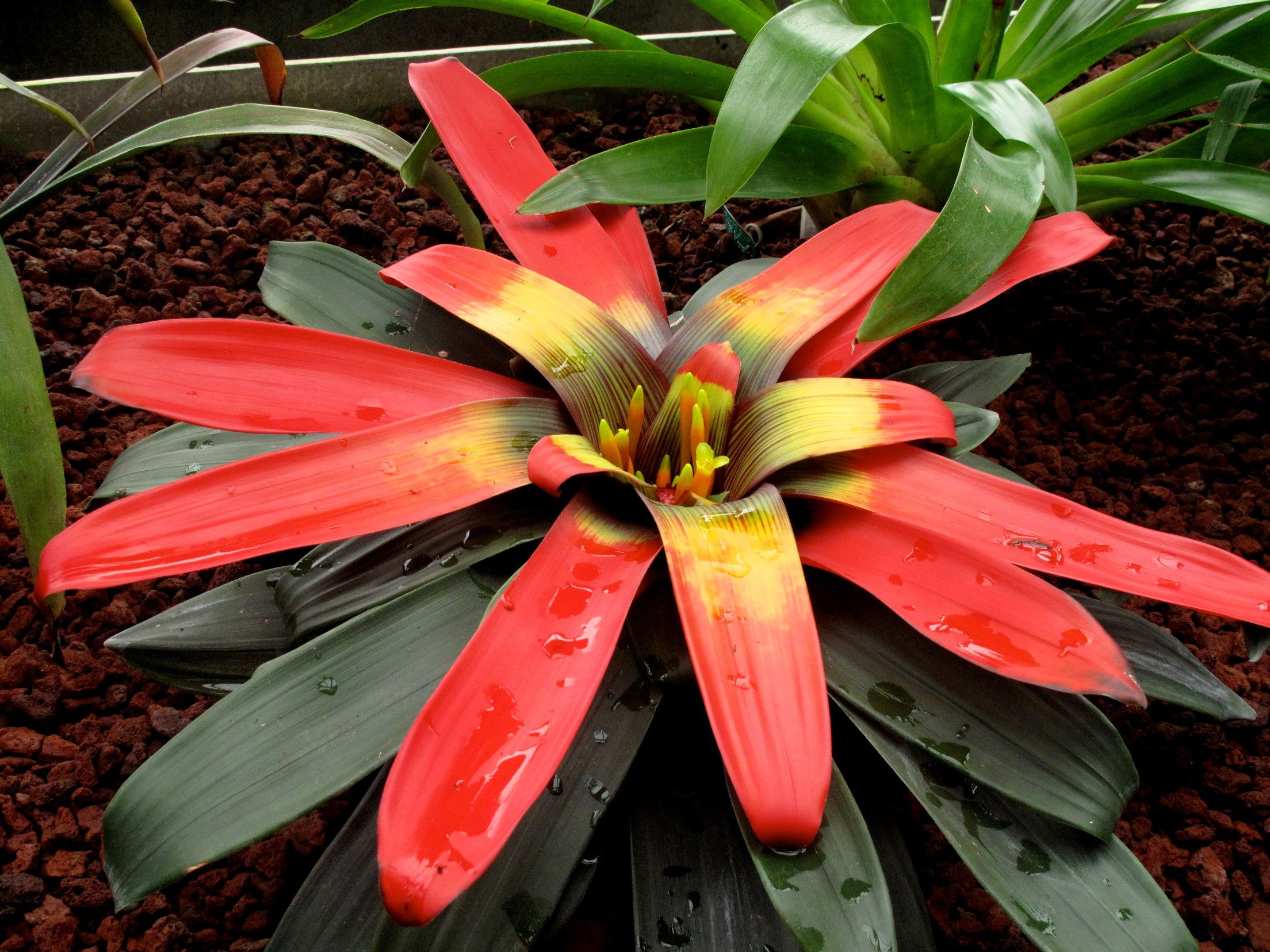
G. sanguinea

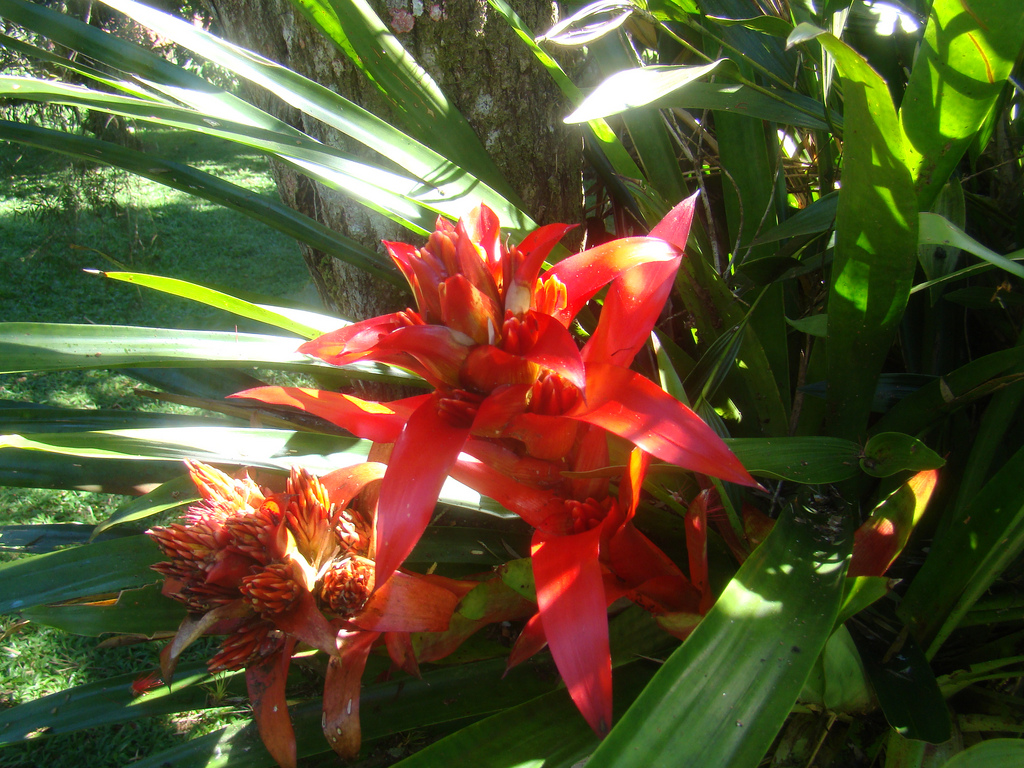
Guzmania wittmackii

- Guzmania acorifolia (Griseb.) Mez
- Guzmania acuminata L.B.Sm.
- Guzmania acutispica E.Gross
- Guzmania aequatorialis L.B.Sm.
- Guzmania albescens H.Luther & Determann
- Guzmania alborosea H.Luther
- Guzmania alcantareoides H.Luther
- Guzmania alliodora E.Gross
- Guzmania altsonii L.B.Sm.
- Guzmania × amoena H.Luther
- Guzmania amplectens L.B.Sm.
- Guzmania andreana (E.Morren) Mez
- Guzmania andreettae Rauh
- Guzmania angustifolia (Baker) Wittm.
- Guzmania apiculata L.B.Sm.
- Guzmania armeniaca H.Luther
- Guzmania asplundii L.B.Sm.
- Guzmania atrocastanea H.Luther
- Guzmania attenuata L.B.Sm. & Read
- Guzmania bakeri (Wittm.) Mez
- Guzmania barbiei Rauh
- Guzmania bergii H.Luther
- Guzmania berteroniana (Schult. & Schult.f.) Mez
- Guzmania besseae H.Luther
- Guzmania betancurii H.Luther
- Guzmania bicolor L.B.Sm.
- Guzmania bipartita L.B.Sm.
- Guzmania bismarckii Rauh
- Guzmania blassii Rauh
- Guzmania brackeana Manzan.
- Guzmania bracteosa (André) André ex Mez
- Guzmania brasiliensis Ule
- Guzmania breviscapa H.Luther
- Guzmania brevispatha Mez
- Guzmania butcheri Rauh
- Guzmania cabrerae Gilmartin
- Guzmania calamifolia André ex Mez
- Guzmania calothyrsus Mez
- Guzmania candelabrum (André) André ex Mez
- Guzmania caricifolia (André) L.B.Sm.
- Guzmania cerrohoyaensis H.Luther
- Guzmania cinnabarina H.Luther & K.F.Norton
- Guzmania circinnata Rauh
- Guzmania claviformis H.Luther
- Guzmania compacta Mez
- Guzmania condensata Mez & Wercklé
- Guzmania condorensis H.Luther
- Guzmania confinis L.B.Sm.
- Guzmania confusa L.B.Sm.
- Guzmania conglomerata H.Luther
- Guzmania conifera (André) André ex Mez
- Guzmania coriostachya (Griseb.) Mez
- Guzmania corniculata H.Luther
- Guzmania cuatrecasasii L.B.Sm.
- Guzmania cuzcoensis L.B.Sm.
- Guzmania cylindrica L.B.Sm.
- Guzmania dalstroemii H.Luther
- Guzmania danielii L.B.Sm.
- Guzmania darienensis H.Luther
- Guzmania delicatula L.B.Sm.
- Guzmania densiflora Mez
- Guzmania desautelsii Read & L.B.Sm.
- Guzmania devansayana E.Morren
- Guzmania diazii H.Luther
- Guzmania diffusa L.B.Sm.
- Guzmania dissitiflora (André) L.B.Sm.
- Guzmania donnellsmithii Mez ex Donn.Sm.
- Guzmania dudleyi L.B.Sm.
- Guzmania dussii Mez
- Guzmania ecuadorensis Gilmartin
- Guzmania eduardi André ex Mez
- Guzmania ekmanii (Harms) Harms ex Mez
- Guzmania elvallensis H.Luther
- Guzmania erythrolepis Brongn. ex Planch.
- Guzmania farciminiformis H.Luther
- Guzmania fawcettii Mez
- Guzmania ferruginea H.Luther
- Guzmania filiorum L.B.Sm.
- Guzmania flagellata S.Pierce & J.R.Grant
- Guzmania foetida Rauh
- Guzmania formosa H.Luther
- Guzmania fosteriana L.B.Sm.
- Guzmania fuerstenbergiana (Kirchhoff & Wittm.) Wittm.
- Guzmania fuquae H.Luther & Determann
- Guzmania garciaensis Rauh
- Guzmania glaucophylla Rauh
- Guzmania globosa L.B.Sm.
- Guzmania glomerata Mez & Wercklé
- Guzmania gloriosa (André) André ex Mez
- Guzmania goudotiana Mez
- Guzmania gracilior (André) Mez
- Guzmania gracilis H.Luther
- Guzmania graminifolia (André ex Baker) L.B.Sm.
- Guzmania harlingii H.Luther
- Guzmania hedychioides L.B.Sm.
- Guzmania henniae H.Luther
- Guzmania herrerae H.Luther & W.J.Kress
- Guzmania hirtzii H.Luther
- Guzmania hitchcockiana L.B.Sm.
- Guzmania hollinensis H.Luther
- Guzmania inexpectata H.Luther
- Guzmania inkaterrae Gouda & C.Soto
- Guzmania izkoi Manzan. & W.Till
- Guzmania jaramilloi H.Luther
- Guzmania kalbreyeri (Baker) L.B.Sm.
- Guzmania kareniae H.Luther & K.F.Norton
- Guzmania kennedyae L.B.Sm. & Read
- Guzmania kentii H.Luther
- Guzmania killipiana L.B.Sm.
- Guzmania kraenzliniana Wittm.
- Guzmania kressii H.Luther & K.F.Norton
- Guzmania laeta H.Luther
- Guzmania lehmanniana (Wittm.) Mez
- Guzmania lellingeri L.B.Sm. & Read
- Guzmania lemeana Manzan.
- Guzmania leonard-kentiana H.Luther & K.F.Norton
- Guzmania lepidota (André) André ex Mez
- Guzmania lindenii (André) Mez
- Guzmania lingulata (L.) Mez
- Guzmania × litaensis H.Luther
- Guzmania longibracteata Betancur & N.R.Salinas
- Guzmania longipetala (Baker) Mez
- Guzmania loraxiana J.R.Grant
- Guzmania lychnis L.B.Sm.
- Guzmania macropoda L.B.Sm.
- Guzmania madisonii H.Luther
- Guzmania manzanaresiorum H.Luther
- Guzmania marantoidea (Rusby) H.Luther
- Guzmania megastachya (Baker) Mez
- Guzmania melinonis Regel
- Guzmania membranacea L.B.Sm. & Steyerm.
- Guzmania mitis L.B.Sm.
- Guzmania monostachia (L.) Rusby ex Mez
- Guzmania morreniana (Linden ex E.Morren) Mez
- Guzmania mosquerae (Wittm.) Mez
- Guzmania mucronata (Griseb.) Mez
- Guzmania multiflora (André) André ex Mez
- Guzmania musaica (Linden & André) Mez
- Guzmania nangaritzae H.Luther & K.F.Norton
- Guzmania nicaraguensis Mez & C.F.Baker
- Guzmania nidularioides L.B.Sm. & Read
- Guzmania nubicola L.B.Sm.
- Guzmania nubigena L.B.Sm.
- Guzmania obtusiloba L.B.Sm.
- Guzmania oligantha Lozano
- Guzmania osyana (E.Morren) Mez
- Guzmania pallida L.B.Sm.
- Guzmania palustris (Wittm.) Mez
- Guzmania paniculata Mez
- Guzmania pattersoniae Manzan.
- Guzmania patula Mez & Wercklé
- Guzmania pearcei (Baker) L.B.Sm.
- Guzmania pennellii L.B.Sm.
- Guzmania plicatifolia L.B.Sm.
- Guzmania plumieri (Griseb.) Mez
- Guzmania polycephala Mez & Wercklé
- Guzmania poortmanii (André) André ex Mez
- Guzmania pseudodissitiflora H.Luther & K.F.Norton
- Guzmania pseudospectabilis H.Luther
- Guzmania pungens L.B.Sm.
- Guzmania puyoensis Rauh
- Guzmania radiata L.B.Sm.
- Guzmania rauhiana H.Luther
- Guzmania regalis H.Luther
- Guzmania remediosensis E.Gross
- Guzmania remyi L.B.Sm.
- Guzmania retusa L.B.Sm.
- Guzmania rhonhofiana Harms
- Guzmania roezlii (E.Morren) Mez
- Guzmania rosea L.B.Sm.
- Guzmania roseiflora Rauh
- Guzmania rubrolutea Rauh
- Guzmania rugosa L.B.Sm. & Read
- Guzmania sanguinea (André) André ex Mez
- Guzmania scandens H.Luther & W.J.Kress
- Guzmania scherzeriana Mez
- Guzmania septata L.B.Sm.
- Guzmania sibundoyorum L.B.Sm.
- Guzmania sieffiana H.Luther
- Guzmania skotakii H.Luther
- Guzmania sneidernii L.B.Sm.
- Guzmania spectabilis (Mez & Wercklé) Utley
- Guzmania sphaeroidea (André) André ex Mez
- Guzmania sprucei (André) L.B.Sm.
- Guzmania squarrosa (Mez & Sodiro) L.B.Sm. & Pittendr.
- Guzmania stenostachya L.B.Sm.
- Guzmania steyermarkii L.B.Sm.
- Guzmania straminea (K.Koch) Mez
- Guzmania striata L.B.Sm.
- Guzmania stricta L.B.Sm.
- Guzmania strobilantha (Ruiz & Pav.) Mez
- Guzmania subcorymbosa L.B.Sm.
- Guzmania tarapotina Ule
- Guzmania tenuifolia (H.Luther) Betancur & N.R.Salinas
- Guzmania terrestris L.B.Sm. & Steyerm.
- Guzmania testudinis L.B.Sm. & Read
- Guzmania teucamae H.Luther & K.F.Norton
- Guzmania teuscheri L.B.Sm.
- Guzmania triangularis L.B.Sm.
- Guzmania undulatobracteata (Rauh) Rauh
- Guzmania vanvolxemii (André) André ex Mez
- Guzmania variegata L.B.Sm.
- Guzmania ventricosa (Griseb.) Mez
- Guzmania verecunda L.B.Sm.
- Guzmania victoriae Rauh
- Guzmania vinacea H.Luther & K.F.Norton
- Guzmania virescens (Hook.) Mez
- Guzmania viridiflora E.Gross
- Guzmania vittata (Mart. ex Schult. & Schult.f.) Mez
- Guzmania weberbaueri Mez
- Guzmania wittmackii (André) André ex Mez
- Guzmania xanthobractea Gilmartin
- Guzmania xipholepis L.B.Sm.
- Guzmania zahnii (Hook.f.) Mez
- Guzmania zakii H.Luther
