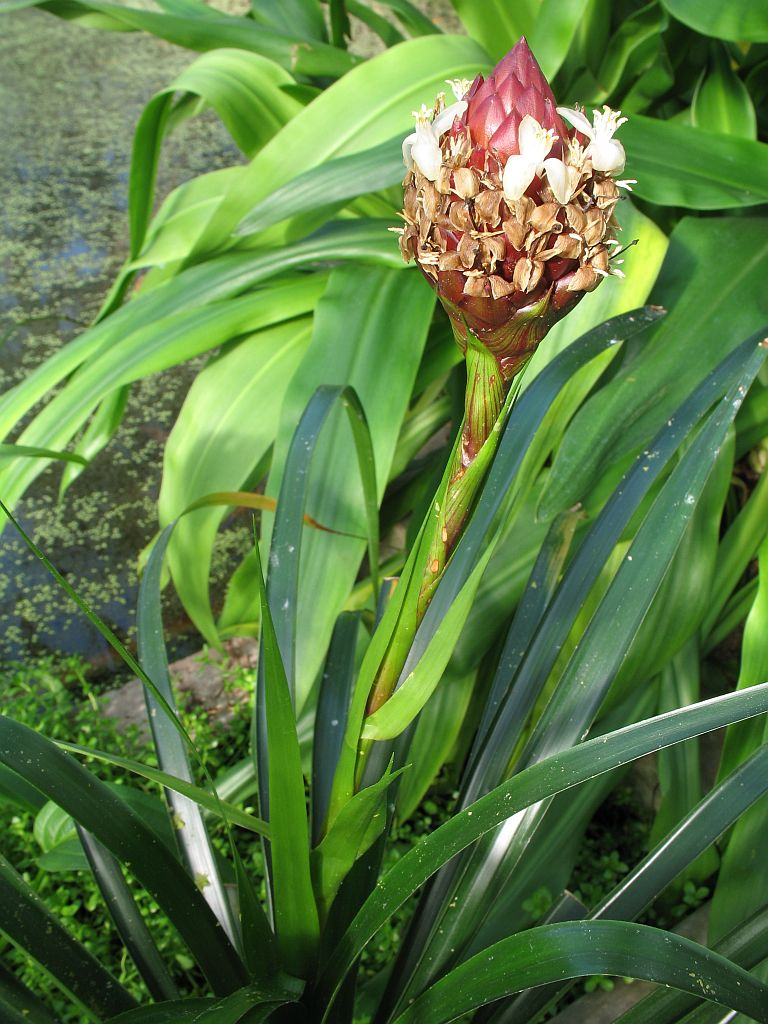

Scientific classification
- Kingdom: Plantae
- Clade: Tracheophytes
- Clade: Angiosperms
- Clade: Monocots
- Clade: Commelinids
- Order: Poales
- Family: Bromeliaceae
- Genus: Guzmania
- Species: G. farciminiformis

Binomial name
- Guzmania farciminiformis H.E.Luther

= Guzmania farciminiformis =

Species of flowering plant

Guzmania farciminiformis is a species of plant in the genus Guzmania. It is in the family Bromeliaceae and the subfamily Tillandsioideae.
