= Guzmania lemeana =

Scientific classification
- Kingdom: Plantae
- Clade: Tracheophytes
- Clade: Angiosperms
- Clade: Monocots
- Clade: Commelinids
- Order: Poales
- Family: Bromeliaceae
- Genus: Guzmania
- Species: G. lemeana

Binomial name
- Guzmania lemeana Manzan

Species of flowering plant

Guzmania lemeana is a species of plant in the genus Guzmania. It is an epiphyte in the family Bromeliaceae. There are no recorded synonyms.
