= Guzmania testudinis =

Scientific classification
- Kingdom: Plantae
- Clade: Tracheophytes
- Clade: Angiosperms
- Clade: Monocots
- Clade: Commelinids
- Order: Poales
- Family: Bromeliaceae
- Genus: Guzmania
- Species: G. testudinis

Binomial name
- Guzmania testudinis L.B.Smith & R.W.Read

Species of flowering plant

Guzmania testudinis is a plant species in the genus Guzmania. This species is native to Ecuador and Colombia.

Two varieties are recognized:

1. Guzmania testudinis var. splendida H.Luther - Ecuador
2. Guzmania testudinis var. testudinis - Colombia, Ecuador
