= Guzmania corniculata =

Conservation status
- Vulnerable (IUCN 3.1)

Scientific classification
- Kingdom: Plantae
- Clade: Tracheophytes
- Clade: Angiosperms
- Clade: Monocots
- Clade: Commelinids
- Order: Poales
- Family: Bromeliaceae
- Genus: Guzmania
- Species: G. corniculata

Binomial name
- Guzmania corniculata H.Luther

Species of flowering plant

Guzmania corniculata is a species of plant in the family Bromeliaceae. It is endemic to Ecuador. Its natural habitat is subtropical or tropical moist lowland forests. It is threatened by habitat loss.
