= Guzmania brasiliensis =

Scientific classification
- Kingdom: Plantae
- Clade: Tracheophytes
- Clade: Angiosperms
- Clade: Monocots
- Clade: Commelinids
- Order: Poales
- Family: Bromeliaceae
- Genus: Guzmania
- Species: G. brasiliensis

Binomial name
- Guzmania brasiliensis Ule

Synonyms
- Schlumbergeria brasiliensis (Ule) Harms

Species of flowering plant

Guzmania brasiliensis is a plant species in the genus Guzmania. This species is native to northern Brazil (Amazonas, Roraima), Peru, Colombia, Venezuela and Ecuador.
