= Guzmania mucronata =

Scientific classification
- Kingdom: Plantae
- Clade: Tracheophytes
- Clade: Angiosperms
- Clade: Monocots
- Clade: Commelinids
- Order: Poales
- Family: Bromeliaceae
- Genus: Guzmania
- Species: G. mucronata

Binomial name
- Guzmania mucronata (Griseb.) Mez

Synonyms
- Tillandsia mucronata Griseb.

Species of flowering plant

Guzmania mucronata is a species of flowering plant of the genus Guzmania in the family Bromeliaceae. This species is endemic to Northern Venezuela.
