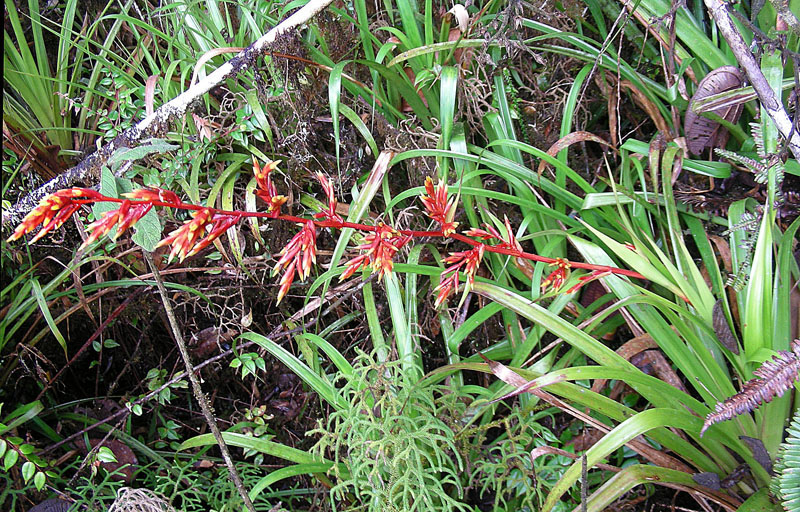

Scientific classification
- Kingdom: Plantae
- Clade: Tracheophytes
- Clade: Angiosperms
- Clade: Monocots
- Clade: Commelinids
- Order: Poales
- Family: Bromeliaceae
- Genus: Guzmania
- Species: G. pennellii

Binomial name
- Guzmania pennellii L.B.Smith

Synonyms
- Thecophyllum pennellii (L.B.Sm.) Mez

= Guzmania pennellii =

Species of flowering plant

Guzmania pennellii is a species of plant in the family Bromeliaceae. It is native to Venezuela and Colombia.
