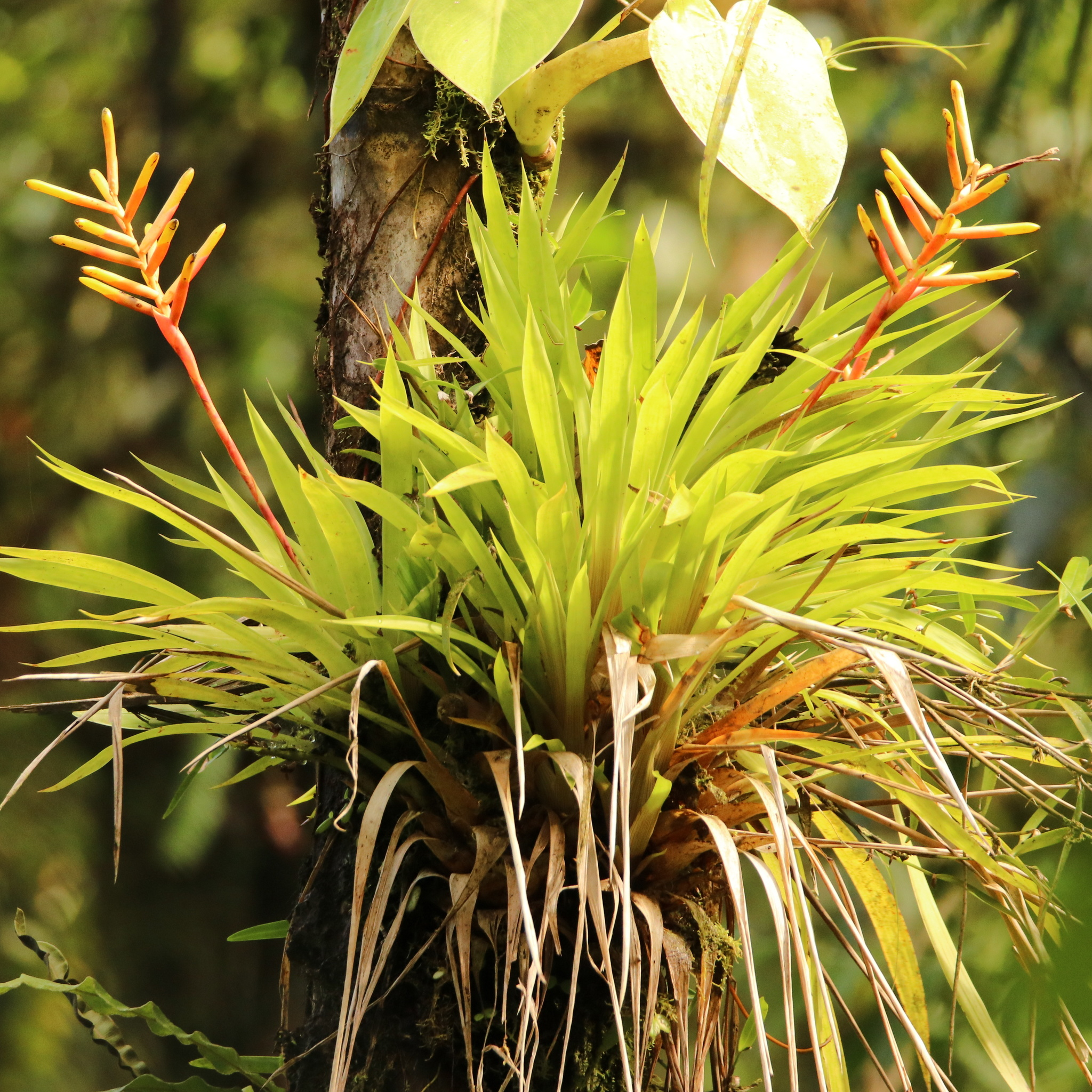
- In Panama

Scientific classification
- Kingdom: Plantae
- Clade: Embryophytes
- Clade: Tracheophytes
- Clade: Spermatophytes
- Clade: Angiosperms
- Clade: Monocots
- Clade: Commelinids
- Order: Poales
- Family: Bromeliaceae
- Genus: Guzmania
- Species: G. sprucei

Binomial name
- Guzmania sprucei (André) L.B.Sm.

Synonyms
- Sodiroa sprucei André

= Guzmania sprucei =

Species of plant

Guzmania sprucei is a species of flowering plant in the Bromeliaceae family. It is native to Costa Rica, Panama, and Colombia.
