= Guzmania longibracteata =

Scientific classification
- Kingdom: Plantae
- Clade: Tracheophytes
- Clade: Angiosperms
- Clade: Monocots
- Clade: Commelinids
- Order: Poales
- Family: Bromeliaceae
- Genus: Guzmania
- Species: G. longibracteata

Binomial name
- Guzmania longibracteata Betancur & N.R.Salinas

Species of flowering plant

Guzmania longibracteata is a species of plant in the genus Guzmania. It is a member of the family Bromeliaceae.
