= Guzmania mosquerae =

Scientific classification
- Kingdom: Plantae
- Clade: Tracheophytes
- Clade: Angiosperms
- Clade: Monocots
- Clade: Commelinids
- Order: Poales
- Family: Bromeliaceae
- Genus: Guzmania
- Species: G. mosquerae

Binomial name
- Guzmania mosquerae (Wittmack) Mez

Synonyms
- Caraguata mosquerae Wittm.; Thecophyllum mosquerae (Wittm.) Mez; Thecophyllum lehmannianum Mez

Species of flowering plant

Guzmania mosquerae is a plant species in the genus Guzmania. This species is native to Ecuador and Colombia.
