= Guzmania killipiana =

Scientific classification
- Kingdom: Plantae
- Clade: Tracheophytes
- Clade: Angiosperms
- Clade: Monocots
- Clade: Commelinids
- Order: Poales
- Family: Bromeliaceae
- Genus: Guzmania
- Species: G. killipiana

Binomial name
- Guzmania killipiana L.B. Smith

Species of flowering plant

Guzmania killipiana is a plant species in the genus Guzmania. This species is native to Bolivia, Peru, and Ecuador.
