= Guzmania polycephala =

Scientific classification
- Kingdom: Plantae
- Clade: Embryophytes
- Clade: Tracheophytes
- Clade: Spermatophytes
- Clade: Angiosperms
- Clade: Monocots
- Clade: Commelinids
- Order: Poales
- Family: Bromeliaceae
- Genus: Guzmania
- Species: G. polycephala

Binomial name
- Guzmania polycephala Mez & Wercklé

Synonyms
- Heterotypic Synonyms: Chirripoa solitaria Suess.

Species of flowering plant

Guzmania polycephala is a species of flowering plant in the family Bromeliaceae. This species is native to Colombia, Costa Rica, andPanama.
