= Guzmania terrestris =

Scientific classification
- Kingdom: Plantae
- Clade: Tracheophytes
- Clade: Angiosperms
- Clade: Monocots
- Clade: Commelinids
- Order: Poales
- Family: Bromeliaceae
- Genus: Guzmania
- Species: G. terrestris

Binomial name
- Guzmania terrestris L.B.Smith & Steyermark

Species of flowering plant

Guzmania terrestris is a plant species in the genus Guzmania. This species is endemic to State of Amazonas in southern Venezuela.
