= Guzmania betancurii =

Scientific classification
- Kingdom: Plantae
- Clade: Tracheophytes
- Clade: Angiosperms
- Clade: Monocots
- Clade: Commelinids
- Order: Poales
- Family: Bromeliaceae
- Genus: Guzmania
- Species: G. betancurii

Binomial name
- Guzmania betancurii H.Luther

Species of flowering plant

Guzmania betancurii is a plant species in the genus Guzmania. This species is native to Colombia and Ecuador. It grows at an elevation of 1300-1700 m.
