= Guzmania marantoidea =

Scientific classification
- Kingdom: Plantae
- Clade: Tracheophytes
- Clade: Angiosperms
- Clade: Monocots
- Clade: Commelinids
- Order: Poales
- Family: Bromeliaceae
- Genus: Guzmania
- Species: G. marantoidea

Binomial name
- Guzmania marantoidea (Rusby) H. Luther

Synonyms
- Tillandsia marantoidea Rusby; Guzmania rio-nievensis Rauh; Guzmania rio-nievensis var. laxiflora Rauh

Species of plant

Guzmania marantoidea is a plant species in the genus Guzmania. This species is native to Peru and Bolivia, and is found in the elevation range of 900–2700 metres above sea level. It is similar to Guzmania paniculata, but with more branches in its inflorescence and "longer, more laxly flowered ultimate branches." G. marantoidea is a herbaceous plant.
