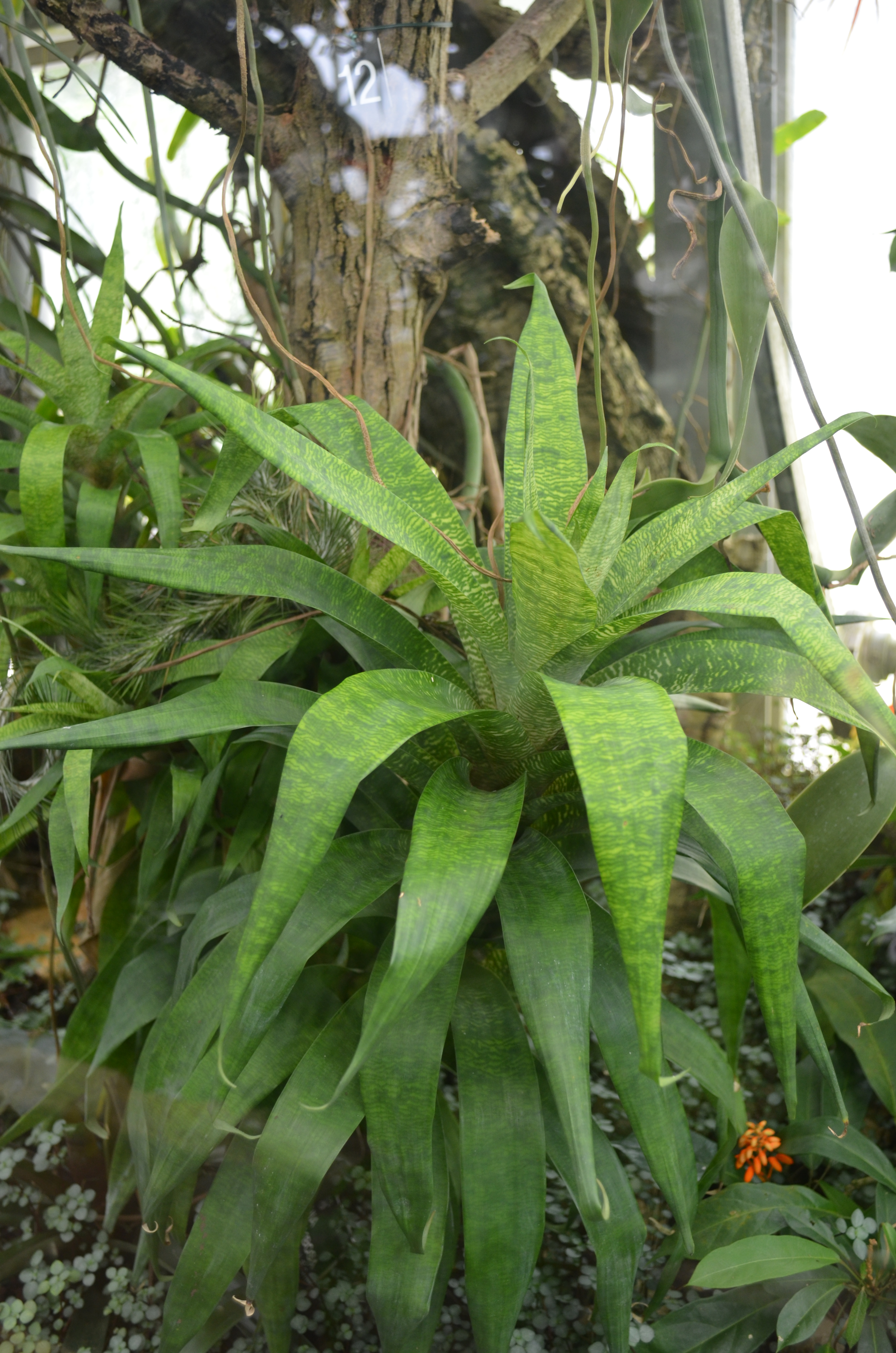

Scientific classification
- Kingdom: Plantae
- Clade: Tracheophytes
- Clade: Angiosperms
- Clade: Monocots
- Clade: Commelinids
- Order: Poales
- Family: Bromeliaceae
- Genus: Guzmania
- Species: G. subcorymbosa

Binomial name
- Guzmania subcorymbosa L.B.Smith

= Guzmania subcorymbosa =

Species of flowering plant

Guzmania subcorymbosa is a plant species in the genus Guzmania. This species is native to Colombia, Panama, and Costa Rica.
