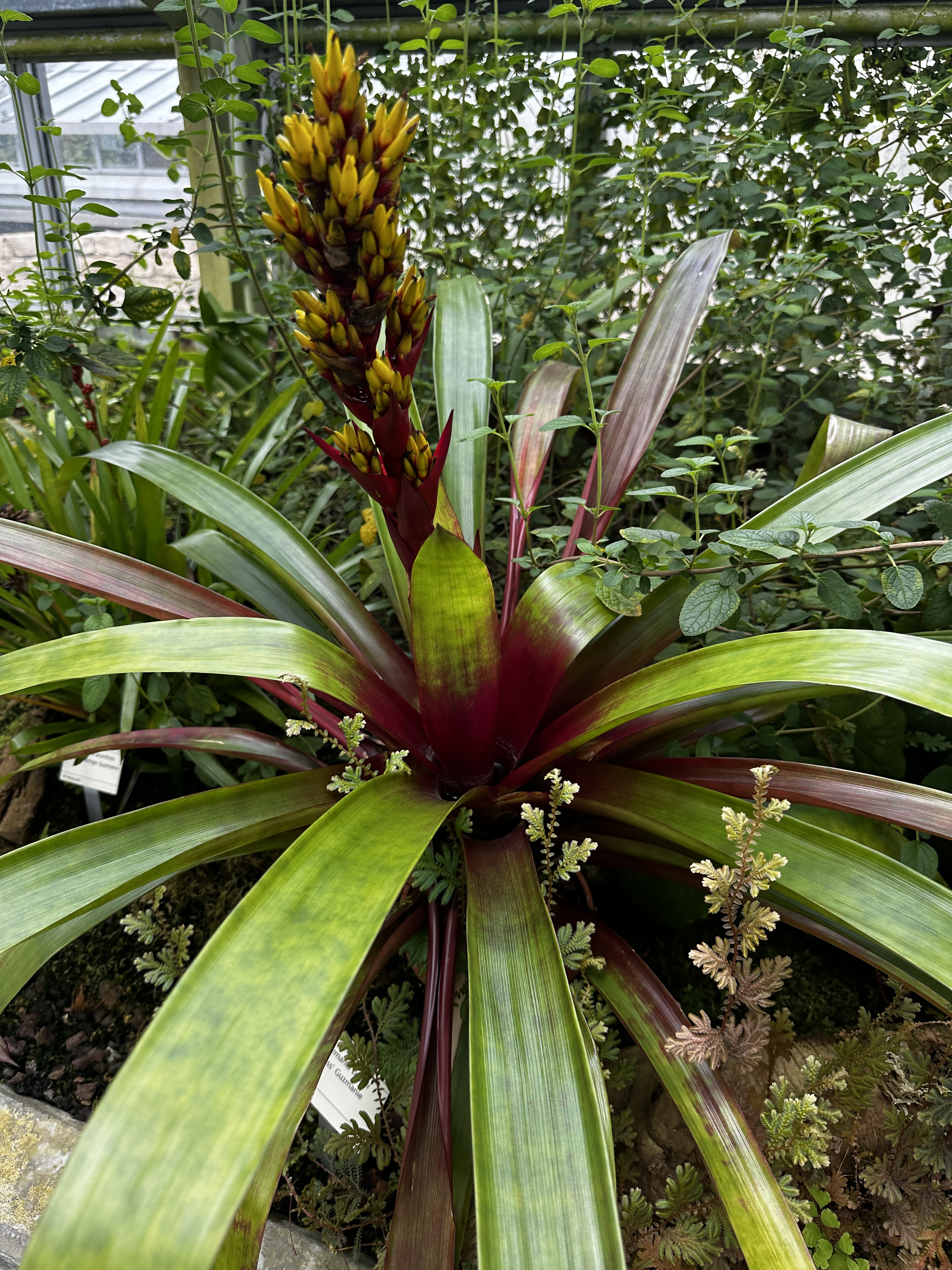

Scientific classification
- Kingdom: Plantae
- Clade: Embryophytes
- Clade: Tracheophytes
- Clade: Spermatophytes
- Clade: Angiosperms
- Clade: Monocots
- Clade: Commelinids
- Order: Poales
- Family: Bromeliaceae
- Genus: Guzmania
- Species: G. blassii

Binomial name
- Guzmania blassii Rauh

= Guzmania blassii =

Species of flowering plant

Guzmania blassii is a plant species in the genus Guzmania. This species is native to Costa Rica.

== Cultivars ==
- Guzmania 'Morado'
- Guzmania 'Twilight'
