= Guzmania acorifolia =

Scientific classification
- Kingdom: Plantae
- Clade: Tracheophytes
- Clade: Angiosperms
- Clade: Monocots
- Clade: Commelinids
- Order: Poales
- Family: Bromeliaceae
- Genus: Guzmania
- Species: G. acorifolia

Binomial name
- Guzmania acorifolia (Griseb.) Mez

Synonyms
- Tillandsia acorifolia Griseb.

Species of flowering plant

Guzmania acorifolia is a species of flowering plant in the family Bromeliaceae. This species is endemic to Venezuela.
