= Guzmania stricta =

Scientific classification
- Kingdom: Plantae
- Clade: Tracheophytes
- Clade: Angiosperms
- Clade: Monocots
- Clade: Commelinids
- Order: Poales
- Family: Bromeliaceae
- Genus: Guzmania
- Species: G. stricta

Binomial name
- Guzmania stricta L.B.Sm.

Species of flowering plant

Guzmania stricta is a plant described by Lyman Bradford Smith. It is a part of the genus Guzmania and family Bromeliaceae. It is an epiphyte.
