= Guzmania gracilior =

Scientific classification
- Kingdom: Plantae
- Clade: Tracheophytes
- Clade: Angiosperms
- Clade: Monocots
- Clade: Commelinids
- Order: Poales
- Family: Bromeliaceae
- Genus: Guzmania
- Species: G. gracilior

Binomial name
- Guzmania gracilior (André) Mez

Synonyms
- Caraguata van-volxemii var. gracilior André

Species of plant

Guzmania gracilior is a species of flowering plant in the Bromeliaceae family. It is native to Ecuador and Colombia.
