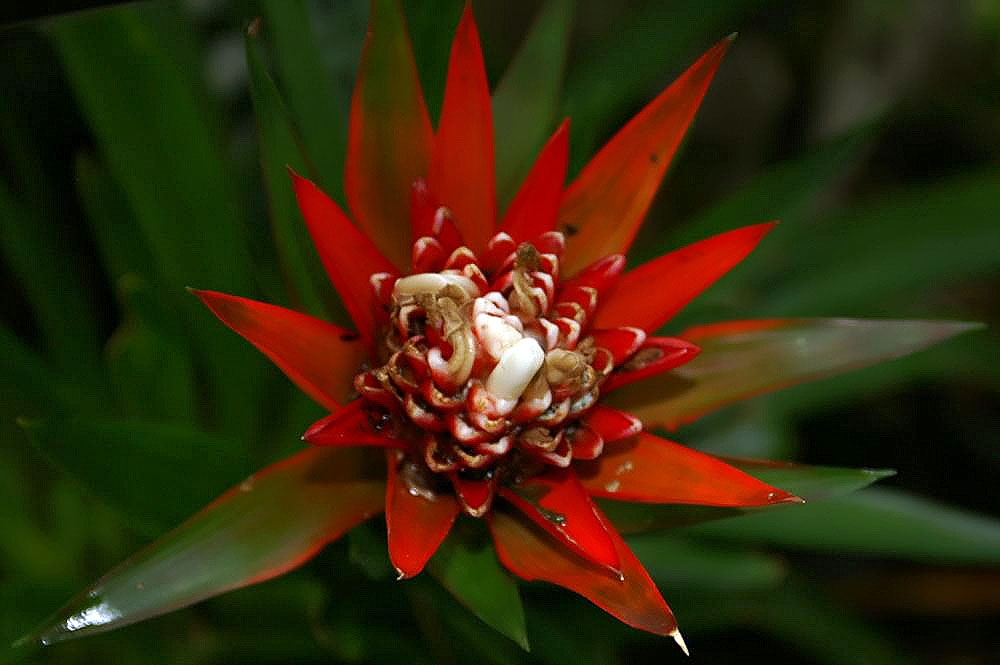

Conservation status
- Endangered (IUCN 3.1)

Scientific classification
- Kingdom: Plantae
- Clade: Tracheophytes
- Clade: Angiosperms
- Clade: Monocots
- Clade: Commelinids
- Order: Poales
- Family: Bromeliaceae
- Genus: Guzmania
- Species: G. fuerstenbergiana

Binomial name
- Guzmania fuerstenbergiana (K.E.Kirchhoff & Wittm.) Wittm.

Synonyms
- Caraguata fuerstenbergiana K.E.Kirchhoff & Wittm.

= Guzmania fuerstenbergiana =

Species of flowering plant

Guzmania fuerstenbergiana is a species of flowering plant in the family Bromeliaceae. It is an epiphyte endemic to Ecuador. Its natural habitats are subtropical or tropical dry forests and subtropical or tropical moist lowland forests. It is threatened by habitat loss.
