= Guzmania globosa =

Scientific classification
- Kingdom: Plantae
- Clade: Tracheophytes
- Clade: Angiosperms
- Clade: Monocots
- Clade: Commelinids
- Order: Poales
- Family: Bromeliaceae
- Genus: Guzmania
- Species: G. globosa

Binomial name
- Guzmania globosa L.B. Smith

Species of flowering plant

Guzmania globosa is a plant species in the genus Guzmania. This species is native to Ecuador, Colombia, and Peru.
