= Guzmania ecuadorensis =

Conservation status
- Endangered (IUCN 3.1)

Scientific classification
- Kingdom: Plantae
- Clade: Tracheophytes
- Clade: Angiosperms
- Clade: Monocots
- Clade: Commelinids
- Order: Poales
- Family: Bromeliaceae
- Genus: Guzmania
- Species: G. ecuadorensis

Binomial name
- Guzmania ecuadorensis Gilmartin

Species of flowering plant

Guzmania ecuadorensis is a species of flowering plant in the family Bromeliaceae. It is an epiphyte endemic to Ecuador. Its natural habitats are subtropical or tropical moist montane forests and subtropical or tropical high-elevation shrubland. It is threatened by habitat loss.
