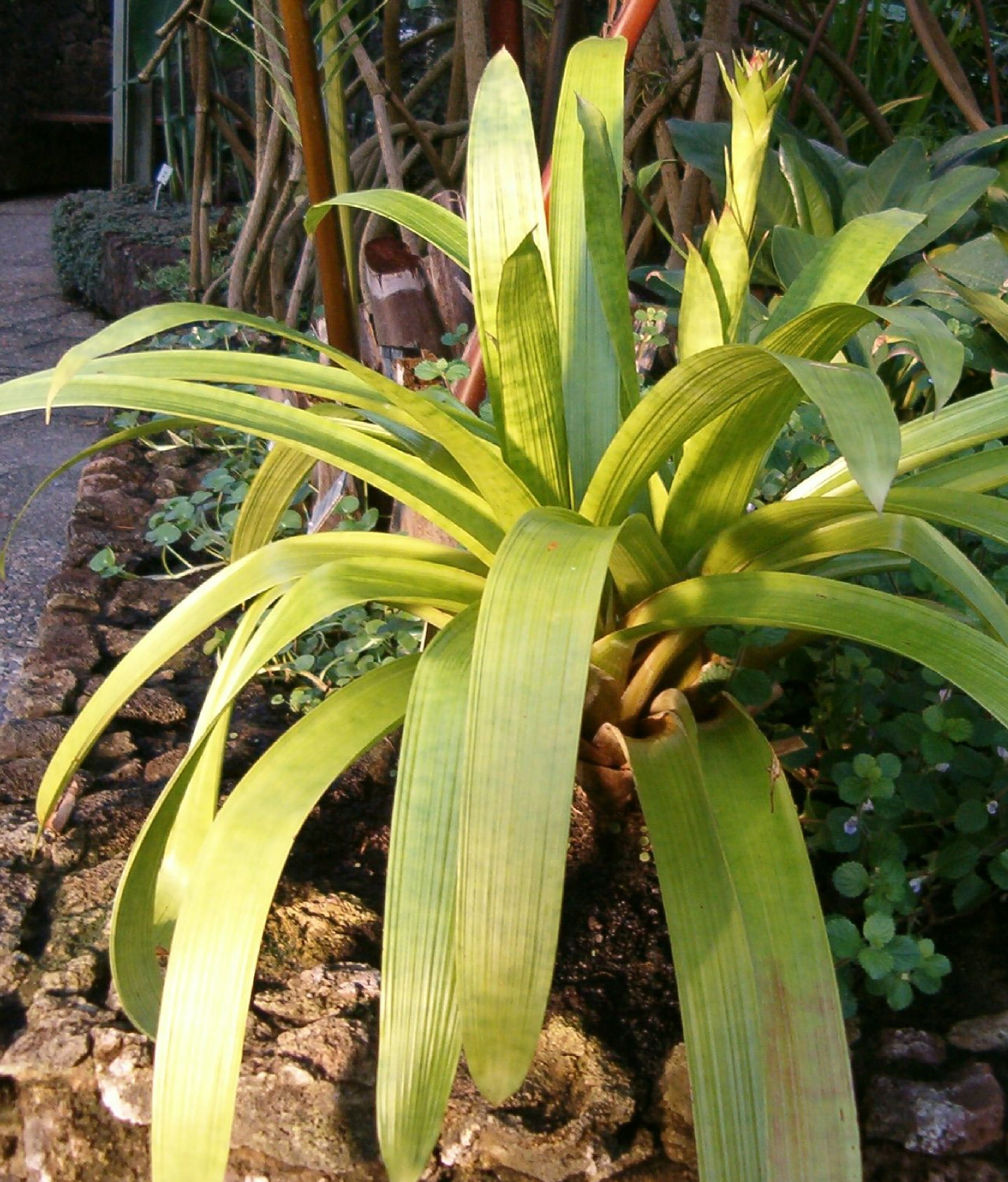

Conservation status
- Endangered (IUCN 3.1)

Scientific classification
- Kingdom: Plantae
- Clade: Tracheophytes
- Clade: Angiosperms
- Clade: Monocots
- Clade: Commelinids
- Order: Poales
- Family: Bromeliaceae
- Genus: Guzmania
- Species: G. rubrolutea

Binomial name
- Guzmania rubrolutea Rauh

= Guzmania rubrolutea =

Species of flowering plant

Guzmania rubrolutea is an endangered species of flowering plant in the family Bromeliaceae. It is an epiphyte endemic to northeastern Ecuador's tropical moist montane forests, places of much habitat loss.
