= Guzmania pearcei =

Scientific classification
- Kingdom: Plantae
- Clade: Tracheophytes
- Clade: Angiosperms
- Clade: Monocots
- Clade: Commelinids
- Order: Poales
- Family: Bromeliaceae
- Genus: Guzmania
- Species: G. pearcei

Binomial name
- Guzmania pearcei (Baker) L.B.Sm.

Synonyms
- Sodiroa pearcei Baker

Species of plant

Guzmania pearcei is a species of flowering plant in Bromeliaceae family. It is native to Ecuador and Colombia.
