= Guzmania obtusiloba =

Scientific classification
- Kingdom: Plantae
- Clade: Tracheophytes
- Clade: Angiosperms
- Clade: Monocots
- Clade: Commelinids
- Order: Poales
- Family: Bromeliaceae
- Genus: Guzmania
- Species: G. obtusiloba

Binomial name
- Guzmania obtusiloba L.B.Smith

Synonyms
- Sodiroa andreana Wittm.

Species of flowering plant

Guzmania obtusiloba is a plant species in the genus Guzmania. This species is native to Costa Rica, Panama, and Colombia.
