= Guzmania patula =

Scientific classification
- Kingdom: Plantae
- Clade: Embryophytes
- Clade: Tracheophytes
- Clade: Spermatophytes
- Clade: Angiosperms
- Clade: Monocots
- Clade: Commelinids
- Order: Poales
- Family: Bromeliaceae
- Genus: Guzmania
- Species: G. patula

Binomial name
- Guzmania patula Mez & Wercklé

Species of flowering plant

Guzmania patula is a species of flowering plant in the family Bromeliaceae. This species is native to Costa Rica, Panama, Colombia, Venezuela, Ecuador, and the State of Amazonas in Brazil.
