= Guzmania bakeri =

Scientific classification
- Kingdom: Plantae
- Clade: Tracheophytes
- Clade: Angiosperms
- Clade: Monocots
- Clade: Commelinids
- Order: Poales
- Family: Bromeliaceae
- Genus: Guzmania
- Species: G. bakeri

Binomial name
- Guzmania bakeri (Wittmack) Mez

Synonyms
- Caraguata bakeri Wittm.; Guzmania elongata Mez & Sodiro; Guzmania drewii L.B.Sm.

Species of flowering plant

Guzmania bakeri is a plant species in the genus Guzmania. This species is native to Ecuador and Colombia.
