= Guzmania calothyrsus =

Scientific classification
- Kingdom: Plantae
- Clade: Tracheophytes
- Clade: Angiosperms
- Clade: Monocots
- Clade: Commelinids
- Order: Poales
- Family: Bromeliaceae
- Genus: Guzmania
- Species: G. calothyrsus

Binomial name
- Guzmania calothyrsus Mez

Synonyms
- Tillandsia calothyrsus Poepp. ex Beer

Species of flowering plant

Guzmania calothyrsus is a plant species in the genus Guzmania. This species is native to Bolivia, Colombia, Peru and Guyana.
