= Guzmania melinonis =

Scientific classification
- Kingdom: Plantae
- Clade: Tracheophytes
- Clade: Angiosperms
- Clade: Monocots
- Clade: Commelinids
- Order: Poales
- Family: Bromeliaceae
- Genus: Guzmania
- Species: G. melinonis

Binomial name
- Guzmania melinonis Regel

Synonyms
- Caraguata melinonis (Regel) E.Morren ex Baker

Species of flowering plant

Guzmania melinonis is a species of plant in the genus Guzmania. This species is native to Bolivia, Peru, Colombia, the Guianas, Venezuela, Amazonas State of Brazil, and Ecuador.
