= Guzmania acutispica =

Scientific classification
- Kingdom: Plantae
- Clade: Tracheophytes
- Clade: Angiosperms
- Clade: Monocots
- Clade: Commelinids
- Order: Poales
- Family: Bromeliaceae
- Genus: Guzmania
- Species: G. acutispica

Binomial name
- Guzmania acutispica E.Gross

Species of plant

Guzmania acutispica is a plant species in the genus Guzmania. This species is native to Ecuador and Peru.
