= Guzmania retusa =

Scientific classification
- Kingdom: Plantae
- Clade: Tracheophytes
- Clade: Angiosperms
- Clade: Monocots
- Clade: Commelinids
- Order: Poales
- Family: Bromeliaceae
- Genus: Guzmania
- Species: G. retusa

Binomial name
- Guzmania retusa L.B.Smith

Synonyms
- Guzmania cerifera Rauh & Barthlott

Species of flowering plant

Guzmania retusa is a plant species in the genus Guzmania. This species is native to Guyana, Colombia, Bolivia, Venezuela and Ecuador.
