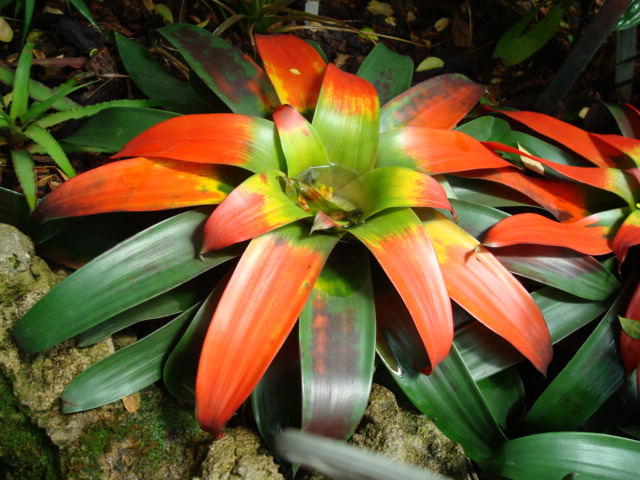

Scientific classification
- Kingdom: Plantae
- Clade: Tracheophytes
- Clade: Angiosperms
- Clade: Monocots
- Clade: Commelinids
- Order: Poales
- Family: Bromeliaceae
- Genus: Guzmania
- Species: G. sanguinea

Binomial name
- Guzmania sanguinea (André) André ex Mez

Synonyms
- Caraguata sanguinea André; Tillandsia sanguinea André; Caraguata sanguinea var. erecta André; Guzmania sanguinea var. erecta (André) Mez; Guzmania crateriflora Mez & Wercklé

= Guzmania sanguinea =

Species of plant

Guzmania sanguinea is a species of plant in the family Bromeliaceae. This species is native to Trinidad and Tobago, Costa Rica (including Costa Rican islands in the Pacific), Panama, Colombia, Venezuela, Ecuador, and northern Brazil.

== Varieties ==
Three varieties are recognized:

1. Guzmania sanguinea var. brevipedicellata Gilmartin - Ecuador
2. Guzmania sanguinea var. comosa H.E.Luther - Colombia, Ecuador
3. Guzmania sanguinea var. sanguinea - most of species range

== Cultivars ==
- Guzmania 'Colombian Gold'
- Guzmania 'Hades'
- Guzmania 'Pink Nova'
- Guzmania 'Tricolor'
