= Guzmania scherzeriana =

Scientific classification
- Kingdom: Plantae
- Clade: Embryophytes
- Clade: Tracheophytes
- Clade: Spermatophytes
- Clade: Angiosperms
- Clade: Monocots
- Clade: Commelinids
- Order: Poales
- Family: Bromeliaceae
- Genus: Guzmania
- Species: G. scherzeriana

Binomial name
- Guzmania scherzeriana Mez

Synonyms
- Heterotypic Synonyms: Guzmania guatemalensis L.B.Sm.; Guzmania herthae Harms; Guzmania scherzeriana var. guatemalensis (L.B.Sm.) L.B.Sm.; Guzmania superba Suess.

Species of flowering plant

Guzmania scherzeriana is a species of flowering plant in the family Bromeliaceae. This species is native to Central America (known from all countries except El Salvador), Colombia and Ecuador.
