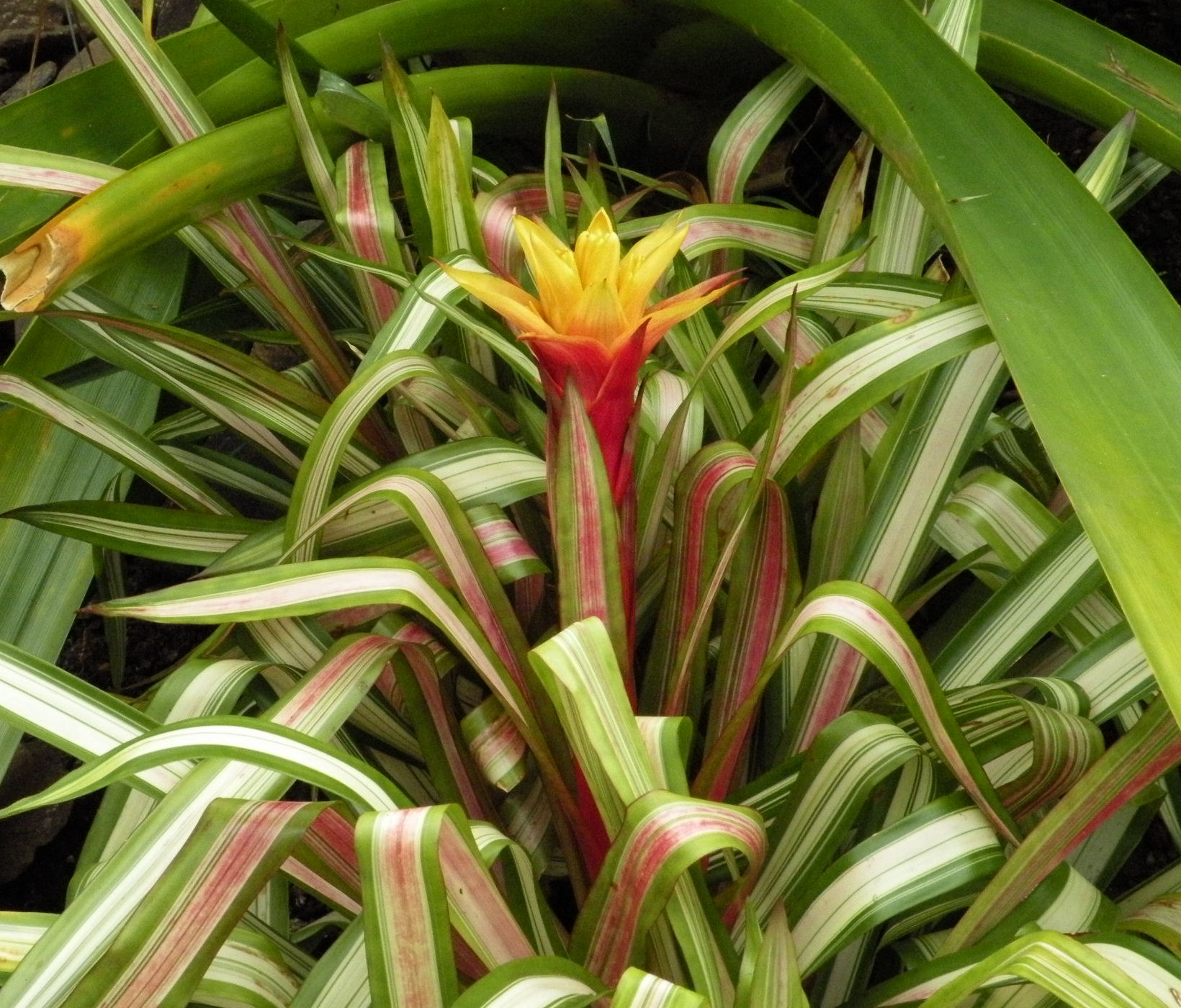

Scientific classification
- Kingdom: Plantae
- Clade: Tracheophytes
- Clade: Angiosperms
- Clade: Monocots
- Clade: Commelinids
- Order: Poales
- Family: Bromeliaceae
- Genus: Guzmania
- Species: G. zahnii

Binomial name
- Guzmania zahnii (Hooker f.) Mez

Synonyms
- Caraguata zahnii Hook.f; Schlumbergeria zahnii (Hook.f.) Harms; Tillandsia zahnii Hook.f.; Guzmania zahnii var. longiscapa Rauh

= Guzmania zahnii =

Species of flowering plant

Guzmania zahnii is a plant species in the genus Guzmania. This species is native to Panama, Nicaragua, and Costa Rica.

== Cultivars ==
- Guzmania 'Chevalieri'
- Guzmania 'Elaine'
- Guzmania Eliane (Elaine)
- Guzmania 'Exotica'
- Guzmania 'Fantasia'
- Guzmania 'Feuer'
- Guzmania 'Feurn'
- Guzmania 'Gisela (Giesela)'
- Guzmania 'Glory Of Ghent'
- Guzmania 'Golden King'
- Guzmania 'Hilde'
- Guzmania 'Insignis'
- Guzmania 'Land Alice'
- Guzmania 'Lingulzahnii'
- Guzmania 'Madam Omer Morobe'
- Guzmania 'Marlebeca'
- Guzmania 'Muriel'
- Guzmania 'Omer Morobe'
- Guzmania 'Symphonie'
- Guzmania 'Victrix'
- xGuzvriesea 'Elata'
- xGuzvriesea 'Magnifica'
- xGuzvriesea 'Mirabilis'
