= Guzmania megastachya =

Scientific classification
- Kingdom: Plantae
- Clade: Embryophytes
- Clade: Tracheophytes
- Clade: Spermatophytes
- Clade: Angiosperms
- Clade: Monocots
- Clade: Commelinids
- Order: Poales
- Family: Bromeliaceae
- Genus: Guzmania
- Species: G. megastachya

Binomial name
- Guzmania megastachya (Baker) Mez

Synonyms
- Tillandsia foliosa Griseb. Tillandsia magna Baker; Tillandsia megastachya Baker

Species of plant

Guzmania megastachya is a species of plant in the genus Guzmania. It is an epiphyte and is a part of the family Bromeliaceae.
