= Guzmania alcantareoides =

Conservation status
- Endangered (IUCN 3.1)

Scientific classification
- Kingdom: Plantae
- Clade: Tracheophytes
- Clade: Angiosperms
- Clade: Monocots
- Clade: Commelinids
- Order: Poales
- Family: Bromeliaceae
- Genus: Guzmania
- Species: G. alcantareoides

Binomial name
- Guzmania alcantareoides H.Luther

Species of flowering plant

Guzmania alcantareoides is a species of plant in the family Bromeliaceae. It is an epiphyteendemic to southeastern Ecuador. Its natural habitat is subtropical or tropical moist montane forests. It is threatened by habitat loss.
