= Guzmania bipartita =

Scientific classification
- Kingdom: Plantae
- Clade: Tracheophytes
- Clade: Angiosperms
- Clade: Monocots
- Clade: Commelinids
- Order: Poales
- Family: Bromeliaceae
- Genus: Guzmania
- Species: G. bipartita

Binomial name
- Guzmania bipartita L.B.Smith

Species of flowering plant

Guzmania bipartita is a plant species in the genus Guzmania. This species is native to Peru, Bolivia and Ecuador.
