= Guzmania confusa =

Scientific classification
- Kingdom: Plantae
- Clade: Tracheophytes
- Clade: Angiosperms
- Clade: Monocots
- Clade: Commelinids
- Order: Poales
- Family: Bromeliaceae
- Genus: Guzmania
- Species: G. confusa

Binomial name
- Guzmania confusa L.B.Smith

Species of flowering plant

Guzmania confusa is a plant species in the genus Guzmania. This species is native to Ecuador and Colombia. Two varieties are recognized:

1. Guzmania confusa var. confusa - Colombia
2. Guzmania confusa var. foetida Rauh - Ecuador
