= Guzmania virescens =

Scientific classification
- Kingdom: Plantae
- Clade: Tracheophytes
- Clade: Angiosperms
- Clade: Monocots
- Clade: Commelinids
- Order: Poales
- Family: Bromeliaceae
- Genus: Guzmania
- Species: G. virescens

Binomial name
- Guzmania virescens (Hooker) Mez

Species of flowering plant

Guzmania virescens is a plant species in the genus Guzmania. This species is endemic to Venezuela.
