= Guzmania claviformis =

Scientific classification
- Kingdom: Plantae
- Clade: Tracheophytes
- Clade: Angiosperms
- Clade: Monocots
- Clade: Commelinids
- Order: Poales
- Family: Bromeliaceae
- Genus: Guzmania
- Species: G. claviformis

Binomial name
- Guzmania claviformis H.E.Luther

Species of plant

Guzmania claviformis is a plant species in the genus Guzmania. This species is native to Ecuador and Peru.
