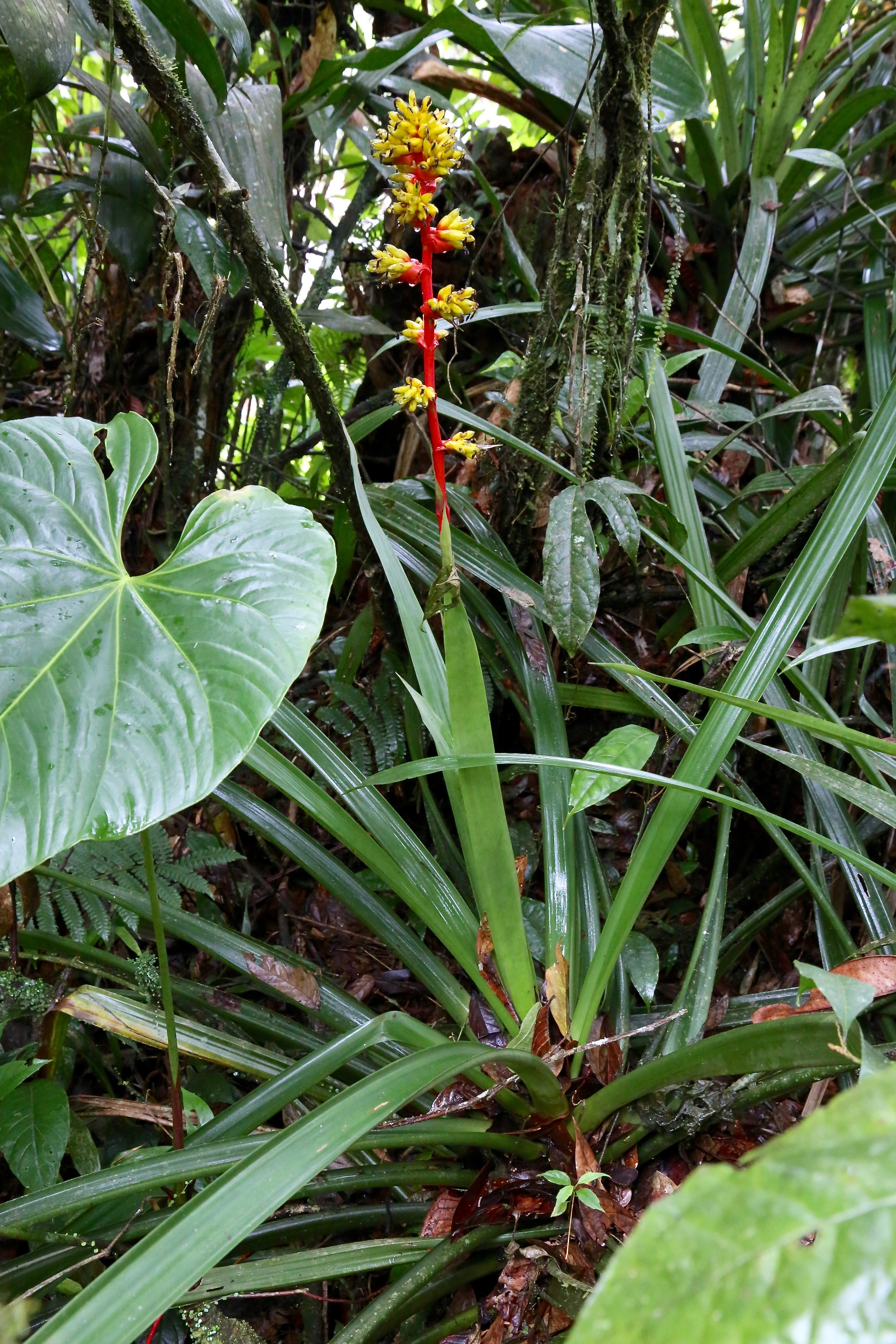
- Guzmania weberbaueri, Ecuador, Rio Puyo

Scientific classification
- Kingdom: Plantae
- Clade: Embryophytes
- Clade: Tracheophytes
- Clade: Spermatophytes
- Clade: Angiosperms
- Clade: Monocots
- Clade: Commelinids
- Order: Poales
- Family: Bromeliaceae
- Genus: Guzmania
- Species: G. weberbaueri

Binomial name
- Guzmania weberbaueri Mez

Synonyms
- Homotypic Synonyms: Schlumbergeria weberbaueri (Mez) Harms; Heterotypic Synonyms: Guzmania dielsii Harms

= Guzmania weberbaueri =

Species of plant

Guzmania weberbaueri is a species of flowering plant in the family Bromeliaceae. This species is native to Ecuador and Peru.
