= Guzmania condensata =

Scientific classification
- Kingdom: Plantae
- Clade: Embryophytes
- Clade: Tracheophytes
- Clade: Spermatophytes
- Clade: Angiosperms
- Clade: Monocots
- Clade: Commelinids
- Order: Poales
- Family: Bromeliaceae
- Genus: Guzmania
- Species: G. condensata

Binomial name
- Guzmania condensata Mez & Wercklé

Synonyms
- Heterotypic Synonyms: Guzmania costaricensis Mez & Wercklé; Guzmania thyrsoidea Rauh

Species of flowering plant

Guzmania condensata is a species of flowering plant in the family Bromeliaceae. This species is native to Costa Rica and Colombia.
