= Guzmania glomerata =

Scientific classification
- Kingdom: Plantae
- Clade: Embryophytes
- Clade: Tracheophytes
- Clade: Spermatophytes
- Clade: Angiosperms
- Clade: Monocots
- Clade: Commelinids
- Order: Poales
- Family: Bromeliaceae
- Genus: Guzmania
- Species: G. glomerata

Binomial name
- Guzmania glomerata Mez & Wercklé

Species of flowering plant

Guzmania glomerata is a species of flowering plant in the family Bromeliaceae. This species is native to Costa Rica, Nicaragua, Panama, Colombia, and Ecuador.
