= Guzmania lychnis =

Scientific classification
- Kingdom: Plantae
- Clade: Tracheophytes
- Clade: Angiosperms
- Clade: Monocots
- Clade: Commelinids
- Order: Poales
- Family: Bromeliaceae
- Genus: Guzmania
- Species: G. lychnis

Binomial name
- Guzmania lychnis L.B. Smith

Species of flowering plant

Guzmania lychnis is a plant species in the genus Guzmania. This species is native to Venezuela, Colombia, and Ecuador.
