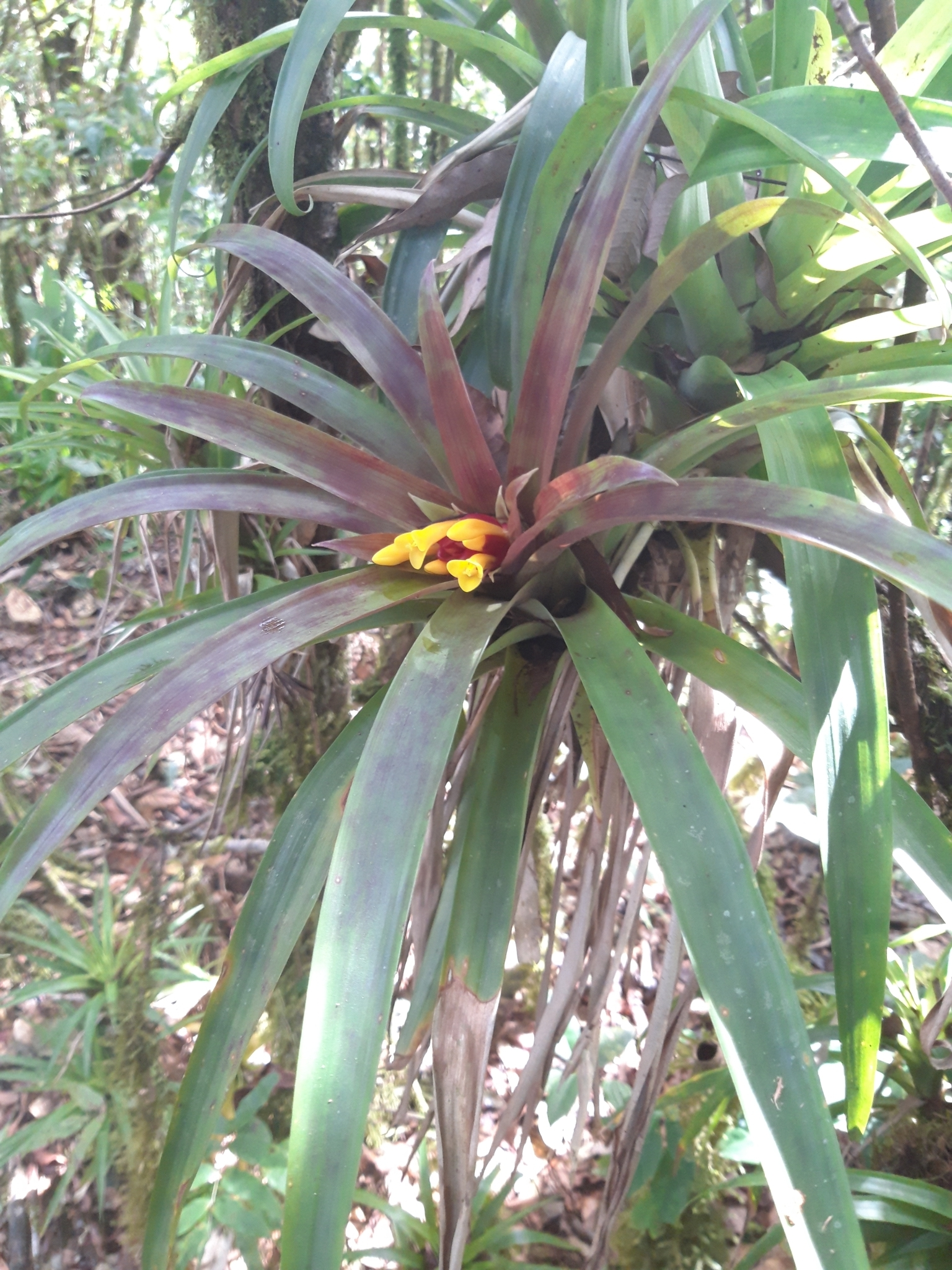

Scientific classification
- Kingdom: Plantae
- Clade: Tracheophytes
- Clade: Angiosperms
- Clade: Monocots
- Clade: Commelinids
- Order: Poales
- Family: Bromeliaceae
- Genus: Guzmania
- Species: G. cerrohoyaensis

Binomial name
- Guzmania cerrohoyaensis H.Luther

= Guzmania cerrohoyaensis =

Species of plant

Guzmania cerrohoyaensis is a flowering plant species from the genus Guzmania. It was found by Chester Skotak and described as small species to about 8 to 12 inches across with the general shape and color of a Guz.
