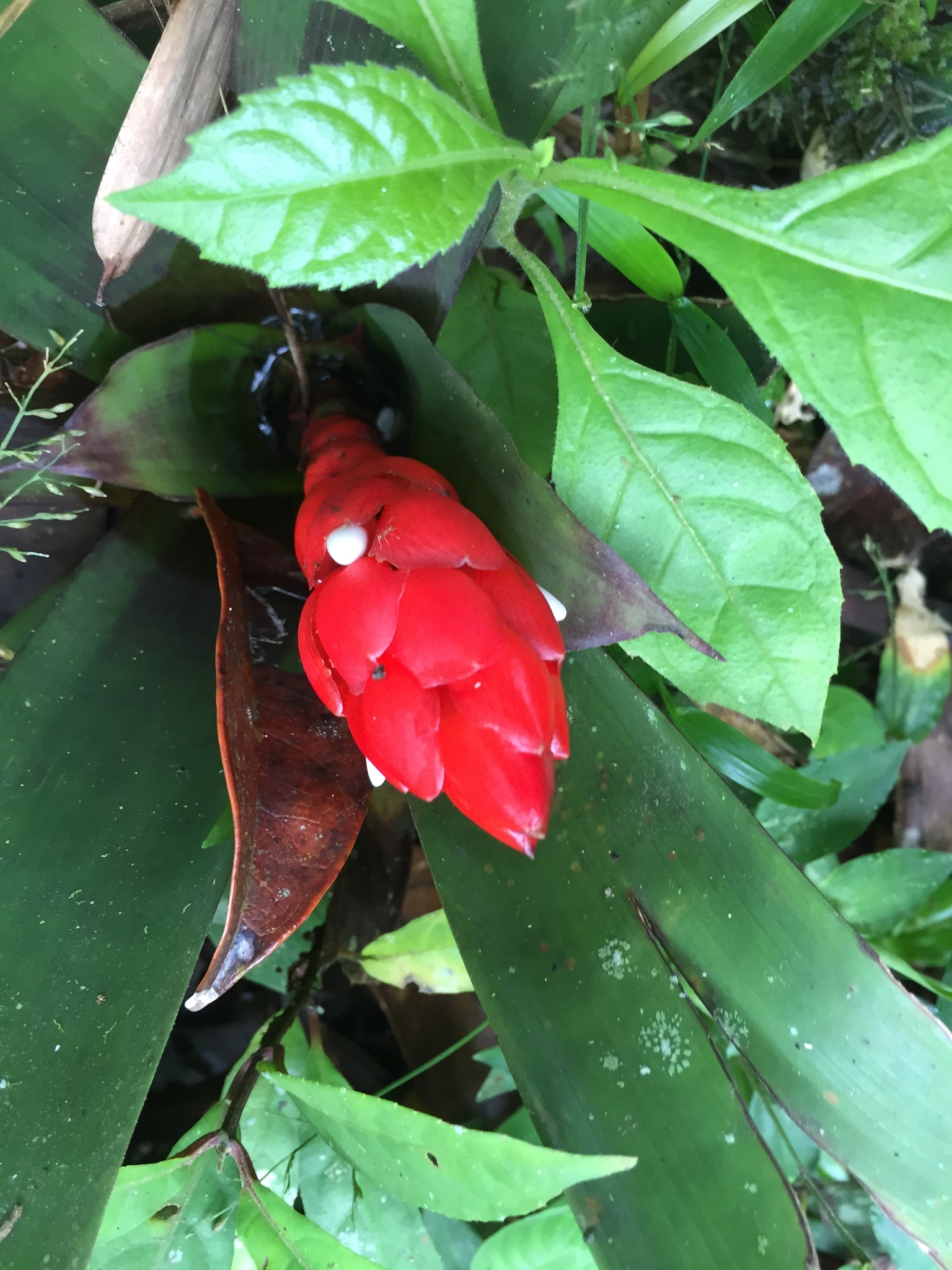

Scientific classification
- Kingdom: Plantae
- Clade: Tracheophytes
- Clade: Angiosperms
- Clade: Monocots
- Clade: Commelinids
- Order: Poales
- Family: Bromeliaceae
- Genus: Guzmania
- Species: G. desautelsii

Binomial name
- Guzmania desautelsii L.B.Smith & R.W.Read

= Guzmania desautelsii =

Species of flowering plant

Guzmania desautelsii is a species of Bromeliads in the genus Guzmania. A plant native to Costa Rica, Nicaragua and Panama, the species was originally described by Robert William Read and Lyman Bradford Smith in 1983.

== Description ==
Guzmania desautelsii flowers at 20–30 cm (7.9–11.8 in) high. The leaves of 30–70 cm (12–28 in) grow in rose-like clusters and are greyish-purple to green. It was first described in 1983 as follows:

PLANT: flowering 2-3 dm high. LEAVES: rosulate, 3-7 dm long, greyish-purple to green beneath, densely punctulate-lepidote throughout becoming less so apically; sheaths distinct, elliptic, ca. 10 cm long; blades ligulate, acute, often acuminate, 3-5 cm wide. SCAPE: erect or ascending, glabrous; scape bracts erect, densely imbricate, the lowest subfoliaceous, the upper subelliptic, acuminate, mostly widely scattered lepidote but densely so apically. INFLORESCENCE: simple, ovoid, ellipsoid or subglobose strobilate, fertile throughout, 7-10 cm long. FLORAL BRACTS: elliptic, to broadly rounded wholly erect and imbricate, thin, chartaceous with membranaceous margins, ca. 4 cm long, exceeding the sepals, orange to scarlet at anthesis, obscurely pale lepidote. FLOWERS: 6-seriate. SEPALS: glabrous, firm, even, coriaceous, obtuse, short-connate, slightly carinate, ca. 20 mm long, wholly covered by the floral bracts. PETALS: white, ca. 28 mm long, barely exserted from bracts, connate for most of their length.

== Distribution ==
Occurrences of Guzmania desautelsii have been documented in Costa Rica and Panama. This range is also confirmed in records on the Global Biodiversity Information Facility and citizen science efforts.
