= Guzmania roezlii =

Scientific classification
- Kingdom: Plantae
- Clade: Tracheophytes
- Clade: Angiosperms
- Clade: Monocots
- Clade: Commelinids
- Order: Poales
- Family: Bromeliaceae
- Genus: Guzmania
- Species: G. roezlii

Binomial name
- Guzmania roezlii (E. Morren) Mez

Synonyms
- Schlumbergeria roezlii E.Morren; Schlumbergeria virescens E.Morren; Tillandsia rigidula Baker

Species of flowering plant

Guzmania roezlii is a plant species in the genus Guzmania. This species is native to Guyana, Venezuela, Ecuador, Peru, Bolivia, and the State of Amazonas in western Brazil.
