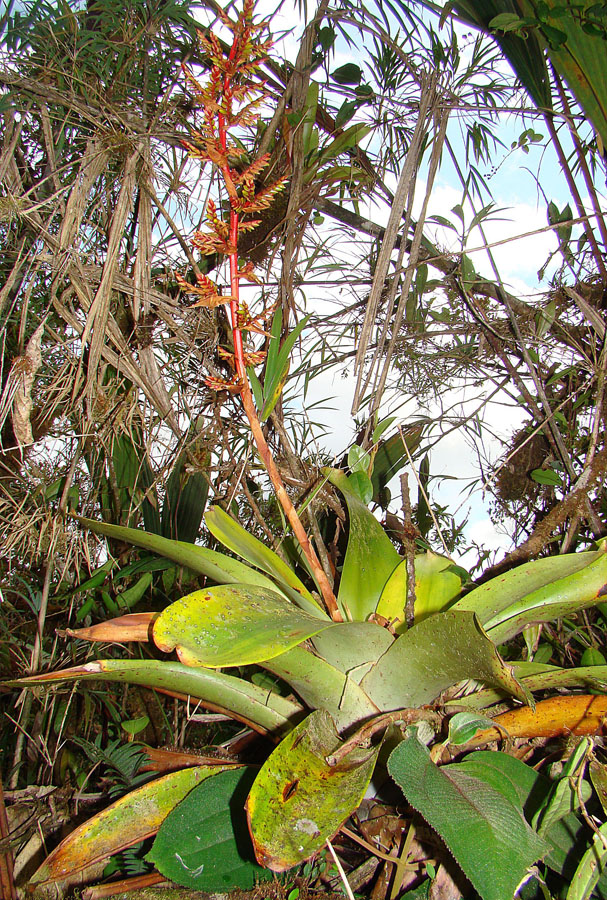

Scientific classification
- Kingdom: Plantae
- Clade: Tracheophytes
- Clade: Angiosperms
- Clade: Monocots
- Clade: Commelinids
- Order: Poales
- Family: Bromeliaceae
- Genus: Guzmania
- Species: G. undulatobracteata

Binomial name
- Guzmania undulatobracteata (Rauh) Rauh

Synonyms
- Tillandsia undulatobracteata Rauh

= Guzmania undulatobracteata =

Species of flowering plant

Guzmania undulatobracteata is a plant species in the genus Guzmania. This species is native to Peru, Bolivia, and Ecuador.
