= Guzmania kraenzliniana =

Scientific classification
- Kingdom: Plantae
- Clade: Tracheophytes
- Clade: Angiosperms
- Clade: Monocots
- Clade: Commelinids
- Order: Poales
- Family: Bromeliaceae
- Genus: Guzmania
- Species: G. kraenzliniana

Binomial name
- Guzmania kraenzliniana Wittm.

Species of epiphyte

Guzmania kraenzliniana is a plant species in the genus Guzmania. It is a member of the family Bromeliaceae. It is an epiphyte.
