= Guzmania longipetala =

Scientific classification
- Kingdom: Plantae
- Clade: Tracheophytes
- Clade: Angiosperms
- Clade: Monocots
- Clade: Commelinids
- Order: Poales
- Family: Bromeliaceae
- Genus: Guzmania
- Species: G. longipetala

Binomial name
- Guzmania longipetala (Baker) Mez

Synonyms
- Tillandsia longipetala Baker; Thecophyllum longipetalum (Baker) Mez

Species of plant

Guzmania longipetala is a species of flowering plant in Bromeliaceae family. It is native to Ecuador and Colombia.
