= Guzmania candelabrum =

Conservation status
- Least Concern (IUCN 3.1)

Scientific classification
- Kingdom: Plantae
- Clade: Tracheophytes
- Clade: Angiosperms
- Clade: Monocots
- Clade: Commelinids
- Order: Poales
- Family: Bromeliaceae
- Genus: Guzmania
- Species: G. candelabrum

Binomial name
- Guzmania candelabrum (André) André ex Mez

Synonyms
- Caraguata candelabrum André

Species of plant

Guzmania candelabrum is a species of flowering plant in the Bromeliaceae family. It is native to Ecuador and Colombia.
