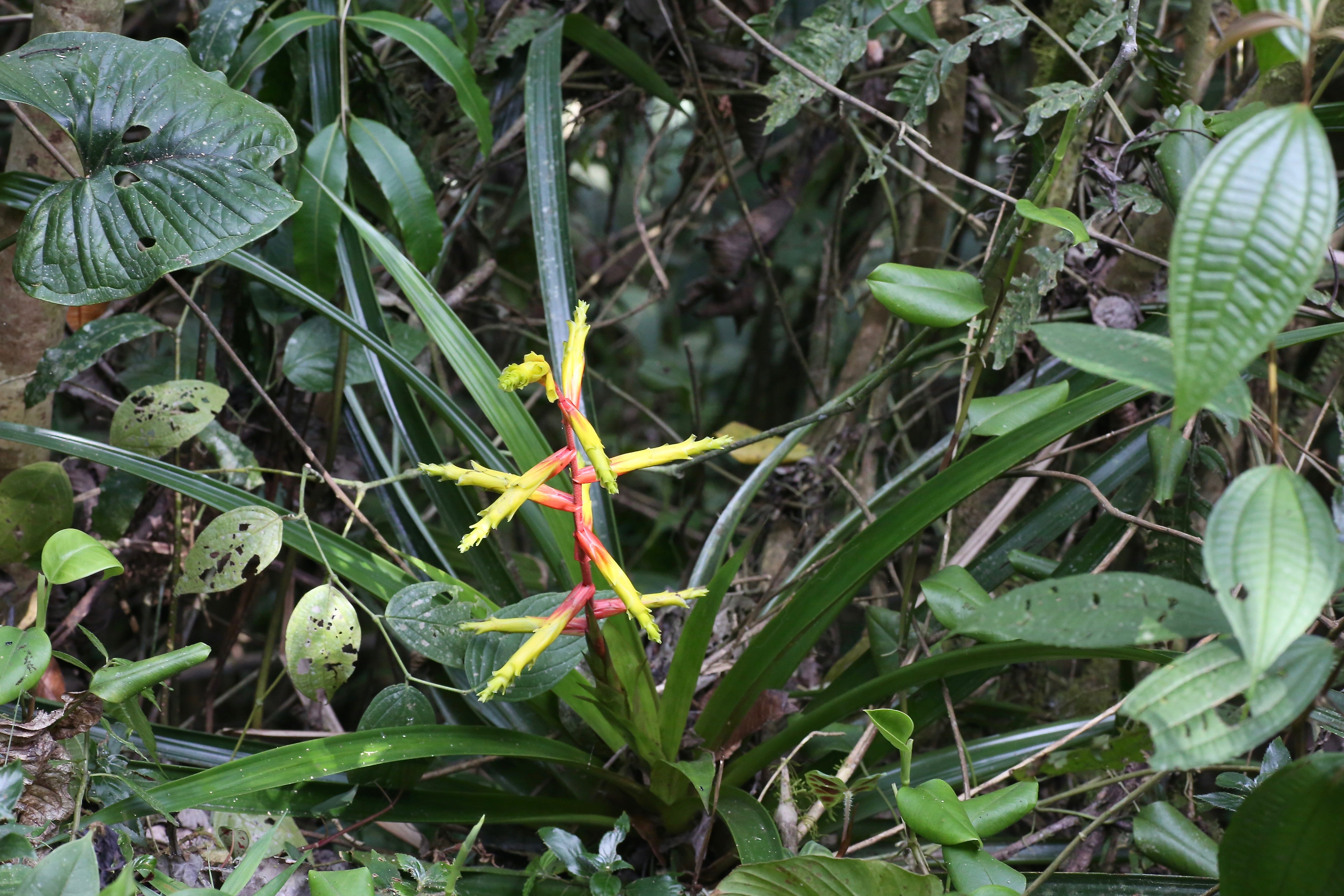
- Guzmania xanthobractea, Ecuador, Mindo cloud forest

Conservation status
- Near Threatened (IUCN 3.1)

Scientific classification
- Kingdom: Plantae
- Clade: Tracheophytes
- Clade: Angiosperms
- Clade: Monocots
- Clade: Commelinids
- Order: Poales
- Family: Bromeliaceae
- Genus: Guzmania
- Species: G. xanthobractea

Binomial name
- Guzmania xanthobractea Gilmartin

= Guzmania xanthobractea =

Species of flowering plant

Guzmania xanthobractea is a species of plant in the family Bromeliaceae. It is endemic to Ecuador. Its natural habitats are subtropical or tropical moist lowland forests and subtropical or tropical moist montane forests. It is threatened by habitat loss.

== Description ==
The species is a terrestrial or epiphyte, clustering, flowering to 1 m (3 ft 3 in) high. Rosulate, spreading leaves are 80–100 mm (3.1–3.9 in) long with elliptic, brown leaf sheaths, to 9 cm × 6 cm (3.5 in × 2.4 in) wide; leaf blades are ligulate, acuminate, 30–50 mm (1.2–2.0 in) wide. Scape is red, curved, about 5 mm (0.20 in) in diameter with subfoliaceous, erect, densely imbricate bracts. Inflorescence is laxly bipinnate, about 40–50 cm (16–20 in) x 15–20 cm (5.9–7.9 in); primary bracts are green and red, ovate, acuminate, 4–8 cm (1.6–3.1 in) long; spikes are ascending, subdensely ellipsoid, 10–14 cm (3.9–5.5 in) long, 40–45 mm (1.6–1.8 in) in diameter, 9–15-flowered. Floral bracts are yellow, imbricate toward apex of spike, obovate, 35–40 mm (1.4–1.6 in) x 15 mm (0.59 in) wide, thin, nerved. Sepals are obovate, acute, 20–22 mm (0.79–0.87 in) x 5–7 mm (0.20–0.28 in), glabrous. Petals are about 5 cm (2.0 in) long with green lobes.
