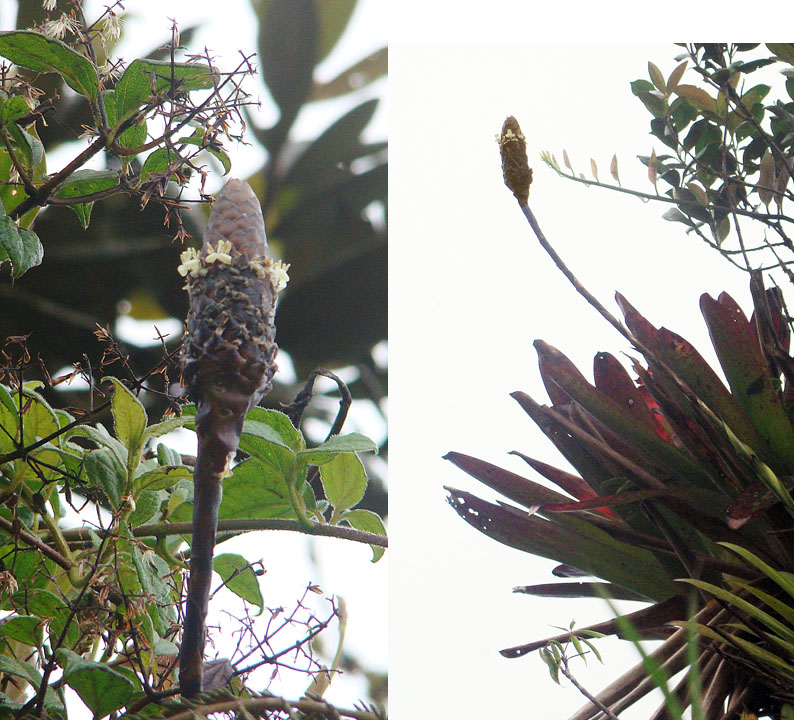

Scientific classification
- Kingdom: Plantae
- Clade: Tracheophytes
- Clade: Angiosperms
- Clade: Monocots
- Clade: Commelinids
- Order: Poales
- Family: Bromeliaceae
- Genus: Guzmania
- Species: G. coriostachya

Binomial name
- Guzmania coriostachya (Griseb.) Mez

Synonyms
- Caraguata coriostachya Griseb.; Tillandsia nigrescens André; Guzmania michelii Mez; Guzmania strobilifera Mez & Wercklé; Guzmania nigrescens (André) Mez

= Guzmania coriostachya =

Species of flowering plant

Guzmania coriostachya is a plant species in the genus Guzmania, and is native to Costa Rica, Panama, Colombia, Venezuela and Ecuador.
