= Guzmania hedychioides =

Scientific classification
- Kingdom: Plantae
- Clade: Tracheophytes
- Clade: Angiosperms
- Clade: Monocots
- Clade: Commelinids
- Order: Poales
- Family: Bromeliaceae
- Genus: Guzmania
- Species: G. hedychioides

Binomial name
- Guzmania hedychioides L.B.Smith

Species of flowering plant

Guzmania hedychioides is a species of flowering plant in the family Bromeliaceae. This species is endemic to the State of Aragua in Venezuela.
