= Guzmania devansayana =

Scientific classification
- Kingdom: Plantae
- Clade: Tracheophytes
- Clade: Angiosperms
- Clade: Monocots
- Clade: Commelinids
- Order: Poales
- Family: Bromeliaceae
- Genus: Guzmania
- Species: G. devansayana

Binomial name
- Guzmania devansayana E.Morren

Synonyms
- Caraguata devansayana (E.Morren) E.Morren ex Baker

Species of plant

Guzmania devansayana is a plant species in the genus Guzmania. This species is native to Ecuador and Peru.
