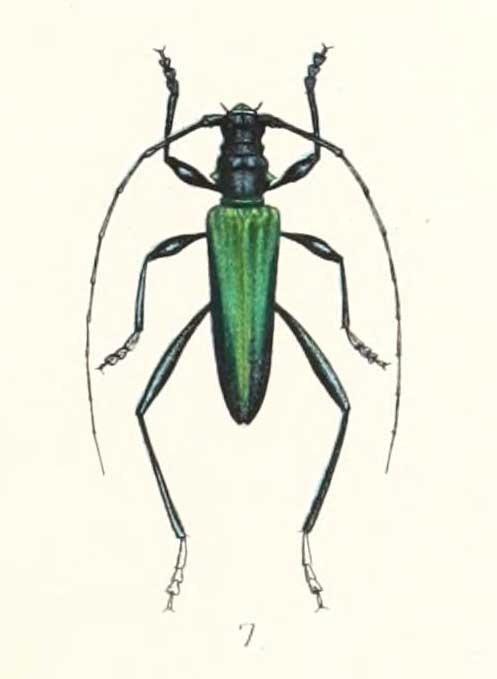
- Drawing of Rhopalophora collaris

Scientific classification
- Kingdom: Animalia
- Phylum: Arthropoda
- Class: Insecta
- Order: Coleoptera
- Suborder: Polyphaga
- Infraorder: Cucujiformia
- Family: Cerambycidae
- Subfamily: Cerambycinae
- Tribe: Rhopalophorini; Blanchard, 1845

= Rhopalophorini =

Tribe of beetles

Rhopalophorini is a tribe of beetles in the subfamily Cerambycinae, containing the following genera:

- Aguassay
- Amphirhoe
- Argyrodines
- Brachylophora
- Closteropus
- Coremia
- Cosmisoma
- Cycnoderus
- Dihammaphora
- Dihammaphoroides
- Dirocoremia
- Disaulax
- Gurubira
- Haenkea
- Ischionodonta
- Lathusia
- Listroptera
- Meringodes
- Merocoremia
- Muxbalia
- Neozodes
- Parozodes
- Potiapua
- Rhopaliella
- Rhopalophora
- Rhopalophorella
- Thalusia
- Timabiara
