= G. spectabilis =

G. spectabilis may refer to:

- Galearis spectabilis, an orchid species
- Gastromyzon spectabilis, a fish species
- Gonystylus spectabilis, a flowering plant species
- Gurubira spectabilis, a beetle species
- Guyanemorpha spectabilis, a beetle species
- Guzmania spectabilis, a flowering plant species
