= Rhopalophora serripennis =

Scientific classification
- Kingdom: Animalia
- Phylum: Arthropoda
- Class: Insecta
- Order: Coleoptera
- Suborder: Polyphaga
- Infraorder: Cucujiformia
- Family: Cerambycidae
- Genus: Rhopalophora
- Species: R. serripennis

Binomial name
- Rhopalophora serripennis Giesbert & Chemsak, 1993

Species of beetle

Rhopalophora serripennis is a species of beetle in the family Cerambycidae. It was described by Giesbert and Chemsak in 1993.

== Appearance ==
Rhopalophora serripennis is a black beetle with a red prothorax. Its body is long and narrow and between 5-9 mm in length. Males and females appear similar, although only males have white pubescence on their abdomen. R. serripennis may be mistaken for R. punctatipennis and R. miniatocollis, two similar species.

== Range ==
Rhopalophora serripennis is found in central and southwestern Mexico, as far north as Nayarit and as far south as Chiapas.
