= Cycnoderus =

Scientific classification
- Domain: Eukaryota
- Kingdom: Animalia
- Phylum: Arthropoda
- Class: Insecta
- Order: Coleoptera
- Suborder: Polyphaga
- Infraorder: Cucujiformia
- Family: Cerambycidae
- Subfamily: Cerambycinae
- Tribe: Rhopalophorini
- Genus: Cycnoderus; Audinet-Serville, 1834

Genus of beetles

Cycnoderus is a genus of beetles in the family Cerambycidae, containing the following species:

- Cycnoderus barbatus Gounelle, 1911
- Cycnoderus brevicolle Giesbert & Chemsak, 1993
- Cycnoderus chlorizans Chevrolat, 1859
- Cycnoderus copei Giesbert & Chemsak, 1993
- Cycnoderus dispar Gounelle, 1911
- Cycnoderus expeditus Chevrolat, 1859
- Cycnoderus guatemalicus Giesbert & Chemsak, 1993
- Cycnoderus intincta (Pascoe, 1866)
- Cycnoderus lividus Giesbert & Chemsak, 1993
- Cycnoderus moestulus (Pascoe, 1866)
- Cycnoderus rufithorax Gounelle, 1911
- Cycnoderus tenuatus Audinet-Serville, 1834
- Cycnoderus virginiae Giesbert & Chemsak, 1993
