= Argyrodines aurivillii =

Scientific classification
- Kingdom: Animalia
- Phylum: Arthropoda
- Class: Insecta
- Order: Coleoptera
- Suborder: Polyphaga
- Infraorder: Cucujiformia
- Family: Cerambycidae
- Genus: Argyrodines
- Species: A. aurivillii

Binomial name
- Argyrodines aurivillii (Gounelle, 1905)

Species of beetle

Argyrodines aurivillii is a species of beetle in the family Cerambycidae. It was described by Gounelle in 1905.
