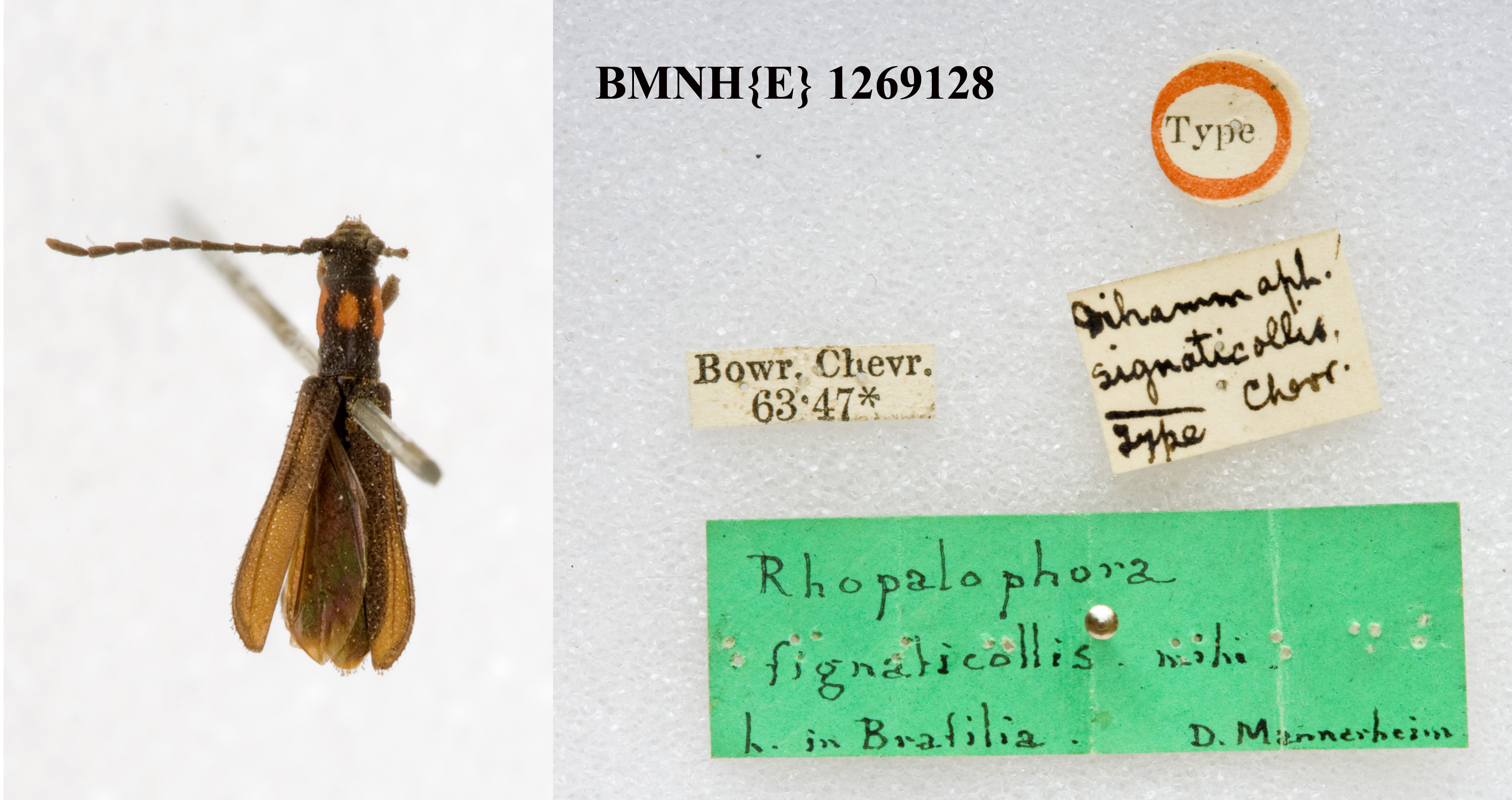
- Dihammaphora signaticollis

Scientific classification
- Domain: Eukaryota
- Kingdom: Animalia
- Phylum: Arthropoda
- Class: Insecta
- Order: Coleoptera
- Suborder: Polyphaga
- Infraorder: Cucujiformia
- Family: Cerambycidae
- Genus: Dihammaphora
- Species: D. signaticollis

Binomial name
- Dihammaphora signaticollis Chevrolat, 1859

= Dihammaphora signaticollis =

Species of beetle

Dihammaphora signaticollis is a species of beetle in the family Cerambycidae. It was described by Chevrolat in 1859.
