= Ischionodonta serripes =

Scientific classification
- Domain: Eukaryota
- Kingdom: Animalia
- Phylum: Arthropoda
- Class: Insecta
- Order: Coleoptera
- Suborder: Polyphaga
- Infraorder: Cucujiformia
- Family: Cerambycidae
- Genus: Ischionodonta
- Species: I. serripes

Binomial name
- Ischionodonta serripes (Bates, 1872)

Species of beetle

Ischionodonta serripes is a species of beetle in the family Cerambycidae. It was described by Bates in 1872.
