= Ischionodonta smaragdina =

Scientific classification
- Kingdom: Animalia
- Phylum: Arthropoda
- Class: Insecta
- Order: Coleoptera
- Suborder: Polyphaga
- Infraorder: Cucujiformia
- Family: Cerambycidae
- Genus: Ischionodonta
- Species: I. smaragdina

Binomial name
- Ischionodonta smaragdina (Martins & Napp, 1989)

Species of beetle

Ischionodonta smaragdina is a species of beetle in the family Cerambycidae. It was described by Martins and Napp in 1989. It is found in Brazil.
