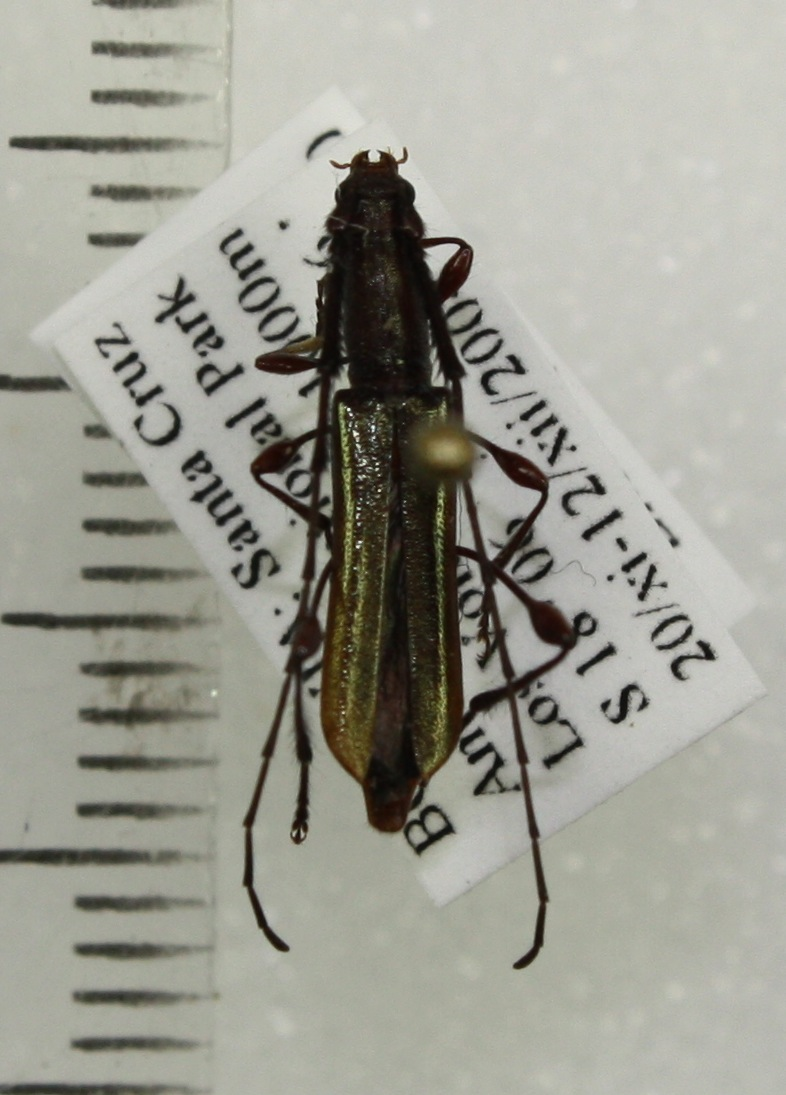

Scientific classification
- Kingdom: Animalia
- Phylum: Arthropoda
- Clade: Pancrustacea
- Class: Insecta
- Order: Coleoptera
- Suborder: Polyphaga
- Infraorder: Cucujiformia
- Family: Cerambycidae
- Genus: Cycnoderus
- Species: C. tenuatus

Binomial name
- Cycnoderus tenuatus Audinet-Serville, 1834

= Cycnoderus tenuatus =

Species of beetle

Cycnoderus tenuatus is a species of beetle in the family Cerambycidae. It was described by Jean Guillaume Audinet-Serville in 1834.
