= Ischionodonta paraibensis =

Scientific classification
- Domain: Eukaryota
- Kingdom: Animalia
- Phylum: Arthropoda
- Class: Insecta
- Order: Coleoptera
- Suborder: Polyphaga
- Infraorder: Cucujiformia
- Family: Cerambycidae
- Genus: Ischionodonta
- Species: I. paraibensis

Binomial name
- Ischionodonta paraibensis Napp & Marques, 1998

Species of beetle

Ischionodonta paraibensis is a species of beetle in the family Cerambycidae. It was described by Napp and Marques in 1998.
