= Rhopalophora cupricollis =

Scientific classification
- Kingdom: Animalia
- Phylum: Arthropoda
- Clade: Pancrustacea
- Class: Insecta
- Order: Coleoptera
- Suborder: Polyphaga
- Infraorder: Cucujiformia
- Family: Cerambycidae
- Genus: Rhopalophora
- Species: R. cupricollis

Binomial name
- Rhopalophora cupricollis Guérin-Méneville, 1844

Species of beetle

Rhopalophora cupricollis is a species of beetle in the family Cerambycidae. It was described by Félix Édouard Guérin-Méneville in 1844.
