= Gurubira erythromos =

Scientific classification
- Kingdom: Animalia
- Phylum: Arthropoda
- Class: Insecta
- Order: Coleoptera
- Suborder: Polyphaga
- Infraorder: Cucujiformia
- Family: Cerambycidae
- Genus: Gurubira
- Species: G. erythromos

Binomial name
- Gurubira erythromos Napp & Marques, 1999

Species of beetle

Gurubira erythromos is a species of beetle in the family Cerambycidae. It was described by Napp and Marques in 1999.
