= Rhopalophora neivai =

Scientific classification
- Kingdom: Animalia
- Phylum: Arthropoda
- Class: Insecta
- Order: Coleoptera
- Suborder: Polyphaga
- Infraorder: Cucujiformia
- Family: Cerambycidae
- Genus: Rhopalophora
- Species: R. neivai

Binomial name
- Rhopalophora neivai Mendes, 1940

Species of beetle

Rhopalophora neivai is a species of beetle in the family Cerambycidae. It was described by Mendes in 1940.
