= Ischionodonta mexicana =

Scientific classification
- Kingdom: Animalia
- Phylum: Arthropoda
- Clade: Pancrustacea
- Class: Insecta
- Order: Coleoptera
- Suborder: Polyphaga
- Infraorder: Cucujiformia
- Family: Cerambycidae
- Genus: Ischionodonta
- Species: I. mexicana

Binomial name
- Ischionodonta mexicana Giesbert & Chemsak, 1993

Species of beetle

Ischionodonta mexicana is a species of beetle in the family Cerambycidae. It was described by Giesbert and Chemsak in 1993.
