= Ischionodonta rufomarginata =

Scientific classification
- Kingdom: Animalia
- Phylum: Arthropoda
- Clade: Pancrustacea
- Class: Insecta
- Order: Coleoptera
- Suborder: Polyphaga
- Infraorder: Cucujiformia
- Family: Cerambycidae
- Genus: Ischionodonta
- Species: I. rufomarginata

Binomial name
- Ischionodonta rufomarginata (Fisher, 1937)

Species of beetle

Ischionodonta rufomarginata is a species of beetle in the family Cerambycidae. It was described by Fisher in 1937.
