= Rhopalophora nigriventris =

Scientific classification
- Kingdom: Animalia
- Phylum: Arthropoda
- Clade: Pancrustacea
- Class: Insecta
- Order: Coleoptera
- Suborder: Polyphaga
- Infraorder: Cucujiformia
- Family: Cerambycidae
- Genus: Rhopalophora
- Species: R. nigriventris

Binomial name
- Rhopalophora nigriventris Bates, 1885

Species of beetle

Rhopalophora nigriventris is a species of beetle in the family Cerambycidae. It was described by Henry Walter Bates in 1885.
