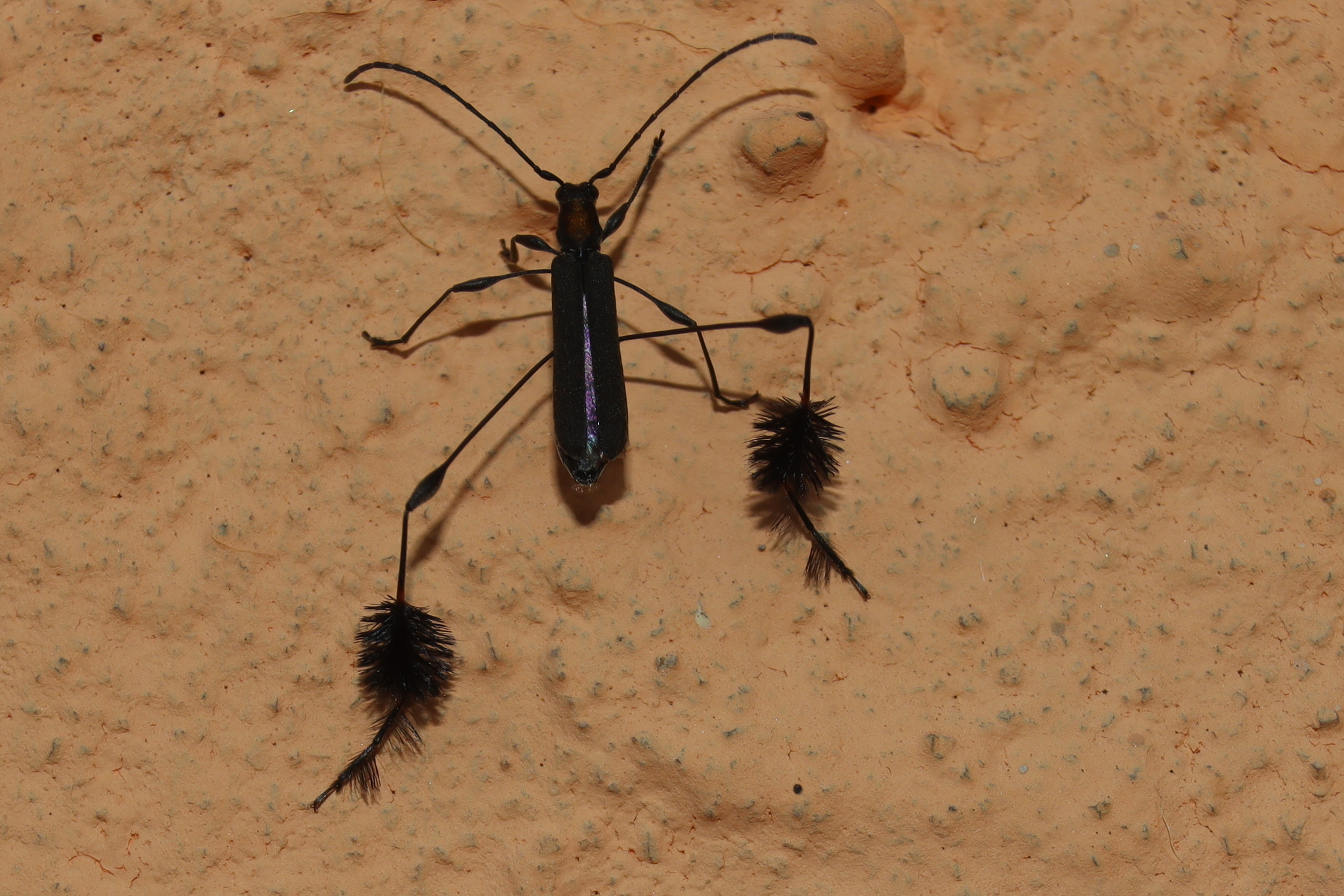

Scientific classification
- Domain: Eukaryota
- Kingdom: Animalia
- Phylum: Arthropoda
- Class: Insecta
- Order: Coleoptera
- Suborder: Polyphaga
- Infraorder: Cucujiformia
- Family: Cerambycidae
- Genus: Coremia
- Species: C. plumipes

Binomial name
- Coremia plumipes (Pallas, 1772)

= Coremia plumipes =

Species of beetle

Coremia plumipes is a species of beetle in the family Cerambycidae. It was described by Pallas in 1772.
