= Coremia signaticollis =

Scientific classification
- Domain: Eukaryota
- Kingdom: Animalia
- Phylum: Arthropoda
- Class: Insecta
- Order: Coleoptera
- Suborder: Polyphaga
- Infraorder: Cucujiformia
- Family: Cerambycidae
- Genus: Coremia
- Species: C. signaticollis

Binomial name
- Coremia signaticollis Buquet in Guérin-Méneville, 1844

Species of beetle

Coremia signaticollis is a species of beetle in the family Cerambycidae. It was described by Buquet in 1844.
