= Ischionodonta serratula =

Scientific classification
- Kingdom: Animalia
- Phylum: Arthropoda
- Clade: Pancrustacea
- Class: Insecta
- Order: Coleoptera
- Suborder: Polyphaga
- Infraorder: Cucujiformia
- Family: Cerambycidae
- Genus: Ischionodonta
- Species: I. serratula

Binomial name
- Ischionodonta serratula Napp & Marques, 1999

Species of beetle

Ischionodonta serratula is a species of beetle in the family Cerambycidae. It was described by Napp and Marques in 1999.
