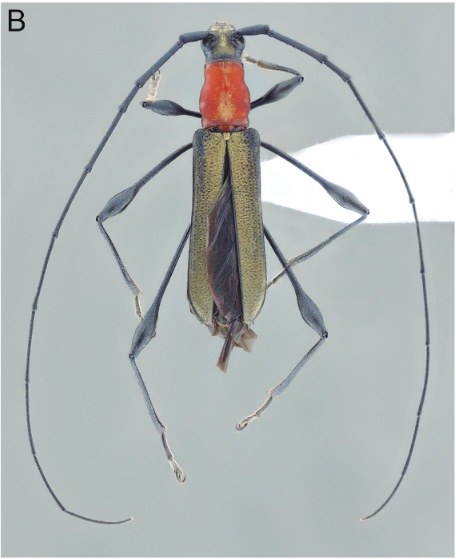

Scientific classification
- Kingdom: Animalia
- Phylum: Arthropoda
- Clade: Pancrustacea
- Class: Insecta
- Order: Coleoptera
- Suborder: Polyphaga
- Infraorder: Cucujiformia
- Family: Cerambycidae
- Genus: Rhopalophora
- Species: R. collaris

Binomial name
- Rhopalophora collaris (Germar, 1824)

Synonyms
- Callichroma collare Germar, 1823; Rhopalophora sanguinicollis Audinet-Serville, 1834

= Rhopalophora collaris =

Species of beetle

Rhopalophora collaris is a species of beetle in the family Cerambycidae. It was described by Ernst Friedrich Germar in 1824. It is found in Bolivia, Brazil (Goiás, Maranhão, Pernambuco, Bahia, Minas Gerais, Espirito Santo, Rio de Janeiro, São Paulo, Paraná, Santa Catarina, Rio Grande do Sul), Paraguay, Argentina and Uruguay.
