= Cycnoderus moestulus =

Scientific classification
- Domain: Eukaryota
- Kingdom: Animalia
- Phylum: Arthropoda
- Class: Insecta
- Order: Coleoptera
- Suborder: Polyphaga
- Infraorder: Cucujiformia
- Family: Cerambycidae
- Genus: Cycnoderus
- Species: C. moestulus

Binomial name
- Cycnoderus moestulus (Pascoe, 1866)

Species of beetle

Cycnoderus moestulus is a species of beetle in the family Cerambycidae. It was described by Pascoe in 1866.
