= Lathusia =

Scientific classification
- Kingdom: Animalia
- Phylum: Arthropoda
- Class: Insecta
- Order: Coleoptera
- Suborder: Polyphaga
- Infraorder: Cucujiformia
- Family: Cerambycidae
- Tribe: Rhopalophorini
- Genus: Lathusia

Genus of beetles

Lathusia is a genus of beetles in the family Cerambycidae, containing the following species:

- Lathusia ferruginea (Bruch, 1908)
- Lathusia parvipilipes (Zajciw, 1959)
