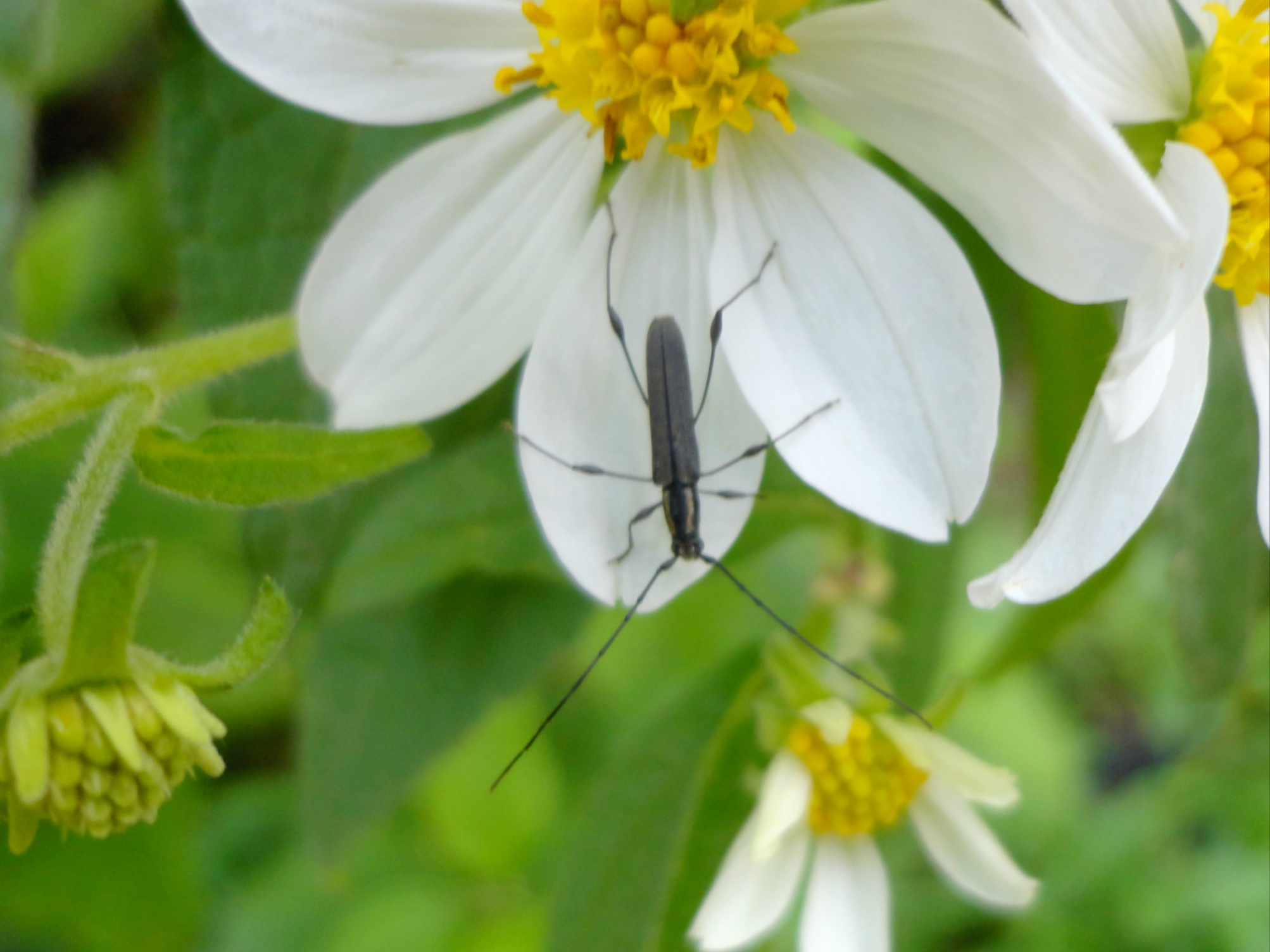

Scientific classification
- Kingdom: Animalia
- Phylum: Arthropoda
- Class: Insecta
- Order: Coleoptera
- Suborder: Polyphaga
- Infraorder: Cucujiformia
- Family: Cerambycidae
- Genus: Rhopalophora
- Species: R. tenuis

Binomial name
- Rhopalophora tenuis (Chevrolat, 1855)

= Rhopalophora tenuis =

Species of beetle

Rhopalophora tenuis is a species of beetle in the family Cerambycidae. It was described by Chevrolat in 1855.
