= Rhopalophora bicolorella =

Scientific classification
- Kingdom: Animalia
- Phylum: Arthropoda
- Class: Insecta
- Order: Coleoptera
- Suborder: Polyphaga
- Infraorder: Cucujiformia
- Family: Cerambycidae
- Genus: Rhopalophora
- Species: R. bicolorella

Binomial name
- Rhopalophora bicolorella Knull, 1934

Species of beetle

Rhopalophora bicolorella is a species of beetle in the family Cerambycidae. It was described by Knull in 1934.
