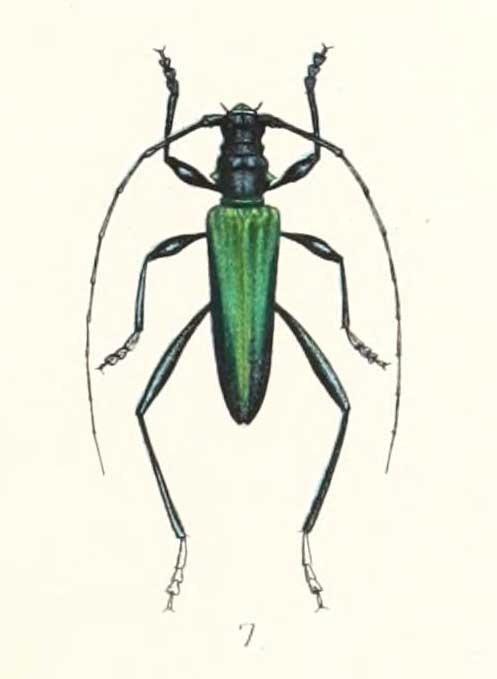
- Rhopalophora collaris

Scientific classification
- Kingdom: Animalia
- Phylum: Arthropoda
- Class: Insecta
- Order: Coleoptera
- Suborder: Polyphaga
- Infraorder: Cucujiformia
- Family: Cerambycidae
- Subfamily: Cerambycinae
- Tribe: Rhopalophorini
- Genus: Rhopalophora; Audinet-Serville, 1834

= Rhopalophora (beetle) =

Genus of beetles

Rhopalophora is a genus of beetles in the family Cerambycidae, containing the following species:

- Rhopalophora angustata Schaeffer, 1905
- Rhopalophora baracoana Zayas, 1975
- Rhopalophora bicolorella Knull, 1934
- Rhopalophora casignata Martins & Napp, 1989
- Rhopalophora collaris (Germar, 1824)
- Rhopalophora cupricollis Guérin-Méneville, 1844
- Rhopalophora dyseidia Martins & Napp, 1989
- Rhopalophora eximia Bates, 1892
- Rhopalophora lineicollis Chevrolat, 1859
- Rhopalophora longipes (Say, 1824)
- Rhopalophora meeskei Casey, 1891
- Rhopalophora miniatocollis Chevrolat, 1859
- Rhopalophora neivai Mendes, 1940
- Rhopalophora nigriventris Bates, 1885
- Rhopalophora occipitalis Chevrolat, 1859
- Rhopalophora paraensis Martins & Napp, 1989
- Rhopalophora prolixa Monné, 1989
- Rhopalophora prorubra Knull, 1944
- Rhopalophora pulverulenta Guérin-Méneville, 1844
- Rhopalophora punctatipennis Linsley, 1935
- Rhopalophora rubecula Bates, 1880
- Rhopalophora rugicollis (LeConte, 1858)
- Rhopalophora serripennis Giesbert & Chemsak, 1993
- Rhopalophora tenuis (Chevrolat, 1855)
- Rhopalophora venezuelensis Chevrolat, 1859
- Rhopalophora yucatana Giesbert & Chemsak, 1993
