= Dihammaphora peruviana =

Scientific classification
- Domain: Eukaryota
- Kingdom: Animalia
- Phylum: Arthropoda
- Class: Insecta
- Order: Coleoptera
- Suborder: Polyphaga
- Infraorder: Cucujiformia
- Family: Cerambycidae
- Genus: Dihammaphora
- Species: D. peruviana

Binomial name
- Dihammaphora peruviana Martins, 1981

Species of beetle

Dihammaphora peruviana is a species of beetle in the family Cerambycidae. It was described by Martins in 1981.
