= Haenkea thoracica =

Scientific classification
- Kingdom: Animalia
- Phylum: Arthropoda
- Class: Insecta
- Order: Coleoptera
- Suborder: Polyphaga
- Infraorder: Cucujiformia
- Family: Cerambycidae
- Genus: Haenkea
- Species: H. thoracica

Binomial name
- Haenkea thoracica (Chevrolat, 1855)

Species of beetle

Haenkea thoracica is a species of beetle in the family Cerambycidae. It was described by Louis Alexandre Auguste Chevrolat in 1855.
