= Parozodes erythrocephalus =

Scientific classification
- Kingdom: Animalia
- Phylum: Arthropoda
- Clade: Pancrustacea
- Class: Insecta
- Order: Coleoptera
- Suborder: Polyphaga
- Infraorder: Cucujiformia
- Family: Cerambycidae
- Genus: Parozodes
- Species: P. erythrocephalus

Binomial name
- Parozodes erythrocephalus Aurivillius, 1897

Species of beetle

Parozodes erythrocephalus is a species of beetle in the family Cerambycidae. It was described by Per Olof Christopher Aurivillius in 1897.
