= Closteropus =

Scientific classification
- Kingdom: Animalia
- Phylum: Arthropoda
- Class: Insecta
- Order: Coleoptera
- Suborder: Polyphaga
- Infraorder: Cucujiformia
- Family: Cerambycidae
- Subfamily: Cerambycinae
- Tribe: Rhopalophorini
- Genus: Closteropus; Chevrolat, 1843

Genus of beetles

Closteropus is a genus of beetles in the family Cerambycidae, containing the following species:

- Closteropus argentatus Bates, 1879
- Closteropus blandus Guérin-Méneville, 1844
- Closteropus herteli Tippmann, 1960
- Closteropus speciosus (Klug, 1825)
