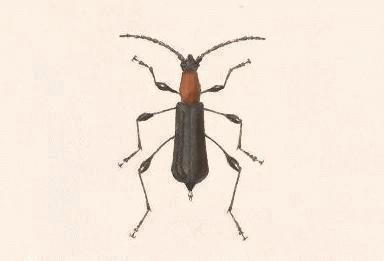
- Dihammaphora chontalensis

Scientific classification
- Domain: Eukaryota
- Kingdom: Animalia
- Phylum: Arthropoda
- Class: Insecta
- Order: Coleoptera
- Suborder: Polyphaga
- Infraorder: Cucujiformia
- Family: Cerambycidae
- Subfamily: Cerambycinae
- Tribe: Rhopalophorini
- Genus: Dihammaphora; Chevrolat, 1859

= Dihammaphora =

Genus of beetles

Dihammaphora is a genus of beetles in the family Cerambycidae, containing the following species:

- Dihammaphora aepytus Chevrolat, 1859
- Dihammaphora arnaui Bosq, 1951
- Dihammaphora auratopilosa Bruch, 1908
- Dihammaphora auricollis Martins, 1981
- Dihammaphora aurovittata Bates, 1880
- Dihammaphora binodula Chevrolat, 1859
- Dihammaphora bivittata Gounelle, 1911
- Dihammaphora bivitticollis Zajciw, 1964
- Dihammaphora brasileira Napp & Mermudes, 2010
- Dihammaphora brevis Chevrolat, 1859
- Dihammaphora bruchi Aurivillius, 1922
- Dihammaphora chaquensis Bosq, 1951
- Dihammaphora chontalensis Bates, 1872
- Dihammaphora cylindricollis Chemsak & Noguera, 1993
- Dihammaphora dispar Chevrolat, 1859
- Dihammaphora falsa Napp & Mermudes, 2010
- Dihammaphora glabripennis Gounelle, 1911
- Dihammaphora gracicollis Chevrolat, 1859
- Dihammaphora gutticollis Gounelle, 1913
- Dihammaphora hispida Bates, 1885
- Dihammaphora ibirijarai Mermudes, 1998
- Dihammaphora laterilineata Zajciw, 1965
- Dihammaphora lineigera Chevrolat, 1859
- Dihammaphora marginicollis Chevrolat, 1859
- Dihammaphora meissneri Melzer, 1934
- Dihammaphora mineira Napp & Mermudes, 2010
- Dihammaphora minuta Chevrolat, 1859
- Dihammaphora nigrita Chevrolat, 1859
- Dihammaphora nigrovittata Fisher, 1937
- Dihammaphora nitidicollis Bates, 1870
- Dihammaphora parana (Gemminger, 1873)
- Dihammaphora perforata (Klug, 1825)
- Dihammaphora peruviana Martins, 1981
- Dihammaphora pilosifrons Gounelle, 1911
- Dihammaphora pusilla Bates, 1870
- Dihammaphora ruficollis Chevrolat, 1859
- Dihammaphora scutata Gounelle, 1911
- Dihammaphora signaticollis Chevrolat, 1859
- Dihammaphora uncinata Napp & Mermudes, 2010
- Dihammaphora vittatithorax Gounelle, 1911
