= Dihammaphora perforata =

Scientific classification
- Domain: Eukaryota
- Kingdom: Animalia
- Phylum: Arthropoda
- Class: Insecta
- Order: Coleoptera
- Suborder: Polyphaga
- Infraorder: Cucujiformia
- Family: Cerambycidae
- Genus: Dihammaphora
- Species: D. perforata

Binomial name
- Dihammaphora perforata (Klug, 1825)

Species of beetle

Dihammaphora perforata is a species of beetle in the family Cerambycidae. It was described by Johann Christoph Friedrich Klug in 1825.
