= Dihammaphora ibirijarai =

Scientific classification
- Domain: Eukaryota
- Kingdom: Animalia
- Phylum: Arthropoda
- Class: Insecta
- Order: Coleoptera
- Suborder: Polyphaga
- Infraorder: Cucujiformia
- Family: Cerambycidae
- Genus: Dihammaphora
- Species: D. ibirijarai

Binomial name
- Dihammaphora ibirijarai Mermudes, 1998

Species of beetle

Dihammaphora ibirijarai is a species of beetle in the family Cerambycidae. It was described by Mermudes in 1998.
