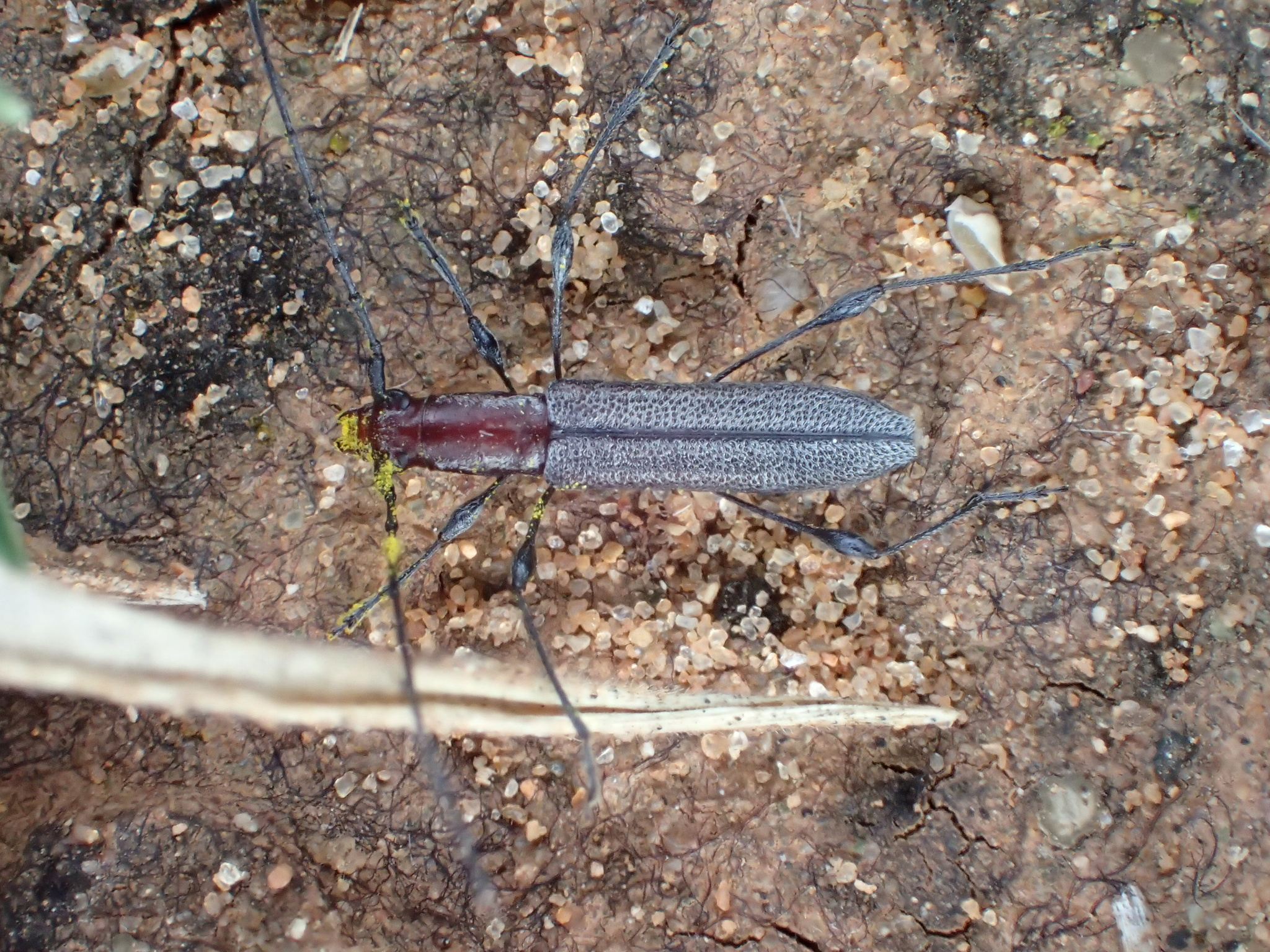

Scientific classification
- Kingdom: Animalia
- Phylum: Arthropoda
- Clade: Pancrustacea
- Class: Insecta
- Order: Coleoptera
- Suborder: Polyphaga
- Infraorder: Cucujiformia
- Family: Cerambycidae
- Genus: Rhopalophora
- Species: R. angustata

Binomial name
- Rhopalophora angustata Schaeffer, 1905

= Rhopalophora angustata =

Species of beetle

Rhopalophora angustata is a species of beetle in the family Cerambycidae. It was described by Schaeffer in 1905.
