= Closteropus argentatus =

Scientific classification
- Kingdom: Animalia
- Phylum: Arthropoda
- Clade: Pancrustacea
- Class: Insecta
- Order: Coleoptera
- Suborder: Polyphaga
- Infraorder: Cucujiformia
- Family: Cerambycidae
- Genus: Closteropus
- Species: C. argentatus

Binomial name
- Closteropus argentatus Bates, 1879

Species of beetle

Closteropus argentatus is a species of beetle in the family Cerambycidae. It was described by Bates in 1879.
