= Gurubira apicalis =

Scientific classification
- Kingdom: Animalia
- Phylum: Arthropoda
- Class: Insecta
- Order: Coleoptera
- Suborder: Polyphaga
- Infraorder: Cucujiformia
- Family: Cerambycidae
- Genus: Gurubira
- Species: G. apicalis

Binomial name
- Gurubira apicalis (E. Fuchs, 1966)

Species of beetle

Gurubira apicalis is a species of beetle in the family Cerambycidae. It was described by Ernst Fuchs in 1966.
