= Lathusia parvipilipes =

Scientific classification
- Kingdom: Animalia
- Phylum: Arthropoda
- Clade: Pancrustacea
- Class: Insecta
- Order: Coleoptera
- Suborder: Polyphaga
- Infraorder: Cucujiformia
- Family: Cerambycidae
- Genus: Lathusia
- Species: L. parvipilipes

Binomial name
- Lathusia parvipilipes (Zajciw, 1959)

Species of beetle

Lathusia parvipilipes is a species of beetle in the family Cerambycidae. It was described by Zajciw in 1959.
