= Dihammaphoroides sanguinicollis =

Scientific classification
- Kingdom: Animalia
- Phylum: Arthropoda
- Clade: Pancrustacea
- Class: Insecta
- Order: Coleoptera
- Suborder: Polyphaga
- Infraorder: Cucujiformia
- Family: Cerambycidae
- Genus: Dihammaphoroides
- Species: D. sanguinicollis

Binomial name
- Dihammaphoroides sanguinicollis Zajciw, 1967

Species of beetle

Dihammaphoroides sanguinicollis is a species of beetle in the family Cerambycidae. It was described by Zajciw in 1967.
