= Dihammaphoroides =

Scientific classification
- Kingdom: Animalia
- Phylum: Arthropoda
- Clade: Pancrustacea
- Class: Insecta
- Order: Coleoptera
- Suborder: Polyphaga
- Infraorder: Cucujiformia
- Family: Cerambycidae
- Tribe: Rhopalophorini
- Genus: Dihammaphoroides

Genus of beetles

Dihammaphoroides is a genus of beetles in the family Cerambycidae, containing the following species:

- Dihammaphoroides jaufferti Galileo & Martins, 2003
- Dihammaphoroides sanguinicollis Zajciw, 1967
