= Listroptera tenebricosa =

Scientific classification
- Kingdom: Animalia
- Phylum: Arthropoda
- Clade: Pancrustacea
- Class: Insecta
- Order: Coleoptera
- Suborder: Polyphaga
- Infraorder: Cucujiformia
- Family: Cerambycidae
- Genus: Listroptera
- Species: L. tenebricosa

Binomial name
- Listroptera tenebricosa (Olivier, 1790)

Species of beetle

Listroptera tenebricosa is a species of beetle in the family Cerambycidae. It was described by Guillaume-Antoine Olivier in 1790.
