= Parozodes pilosus =

Scientific classification
- Kingdom: Animalia
- Phylum: Arthropoda
- Clade: Pancrustacea
- Class: Insecta
- Order: Coleoptera
- Suborder: Polyphaga
- Infraorder: Cucujiformia
- Family: Cerambycidae
- Genus: Parozodes
- Species: P. pilosus

Binomial name
- Parozodes pilosus E. Fuchs, 1956

Species of beetle

Parozodes pilosus is a species of beetle in the family Cerambycidae. It was described by Ernst Fuchs in 1956.
