= Ischionodonta colombiana =

Scientific classification
- Kingdom: Animalia
- Phylum: Arthropoda
- Clade: Pancrustacea
- Class: Insecta
- Order: Coleoptera
- Suborder: Polyphaga
- Infraorder: Cucujiformia
- Family: Cerambycidae
- Genus: Ischionodonta
- Species: I. colombiana

Binomial name
- Ischionodonta colombiana Napp & Marques, 1999

Species of beetle

Ischionodonta colombiana is a species of beetle in the family Cerambycidae. It was described by Napp and Marques in 1999.
