= Ischionodonta lansbergei =

Scientific classification
- Domain: Eukaryota
- Kingdom: Animalia
- Phylum: Arthropoda
- Class: Insecta
- Order: Coleoptera
- Suborder: Polyphaga
- Infraorder: Cucujiformia
- Family: Cerambycidae
- Genus: Ischionodonta
- Species: I. lansbergei

Binomial name
- Ischionodonta lansbergei (Lameere, 1884)

Synonyms
- Rhopalophora lansbergei Lameere, 1884

Species of beetle

Ischionodonta lansbergei is a species of beetle in the family Cerambycidae. It was described by Auguste Lameere in 1884.
