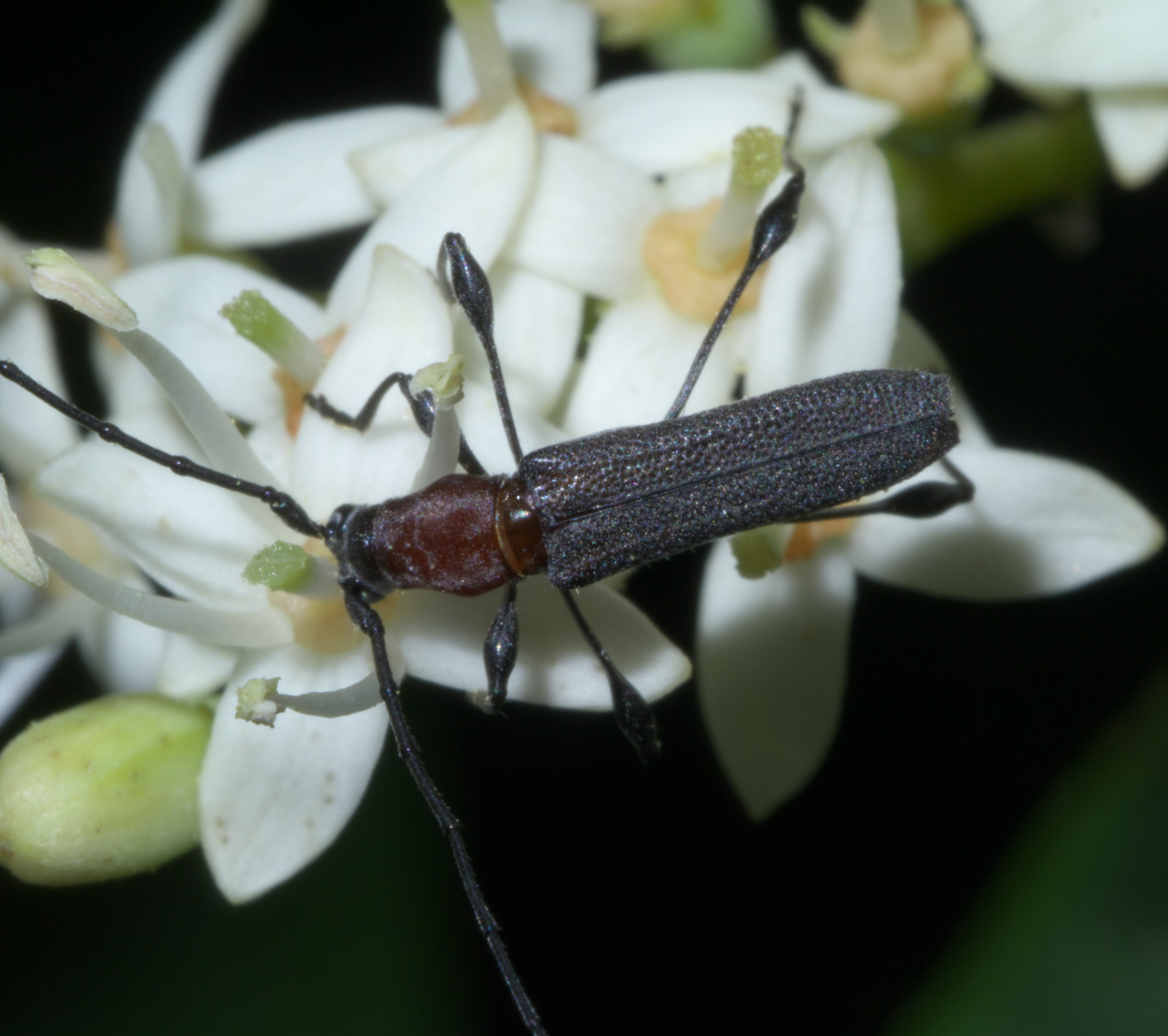

Scientific classification
- Kingdom: Animalia
- Phylum: Arthropoda
- Class: Insecta
- Order: Coleoptera
- Suborder: Polyphaga
- Infraorder: Cucujiformia
- Family: Cerambycidae
- Genus: Rhopalophora
- Species: R. longipes

Binomial name
- Rhopalophora longipes (Say, 1824)

= Rhopalophora longipes =

Species of beetle

Rhopalophora longipes is a species of beetle in the family Cerambycidae. It was described by Say in 1824.
