= Ischionodonta semirubra =

Scientific classification
- Kingdom: Animalia
- Phylum: Arthropoda
- Clade: Pancrustacea
- Class: Insecta
- Order: Coleoptera
- Suborder: Polyphaga
- Infraorder: Cucujiformia
- Family: Cerambycidae
- Genus: Ischionodonta
- Species: I. semirubra

Binomial name
- Ischionodonta semirubra (Burmeister, 1865)

Species of beetle

Ischionodonta semirubra is a species of beetle in the family Cerambycidae. It was described by Hermann Burmeister in 1865.
