= Lathusia ferruginea =

Scientific classification
- Kingdom: Animalia
- Phylum: Arthropoda
- Clade: Pancrustacea
- Class: Insecta
- Order: Coleoptera
- Suborder: Polyphaga
- Infraorder: Cucujiformia
- Family: Cerambycidae
- Genus: Lathusia
- Species: L. ferruginea

Binomial name
- Lathusia ferruginea (Bruch, 1908)

Species of beetle

Lathusia ferruginea is a species of beetle in the family Cerambycidae. It was described by Bruch in 1908.
