= Thalusia atrata =

Scientific classification
- Kingdom: Animalia
- Phylum: Arthropoda
- Clade: Pancrustacea
- Class: Insecta
- Order: Coleoptera
- Suborder: Polyphaga
- Infraorder: Cucujiformia
- Family: Cerambycidae
- Genus: Thalusia
- Species: T. atrata

Binomial name
- Thalusia atrata (Melzer, 1918)

Species of beetle

Thalusia atrata is a species of beetle in the family Cerambycidae. It was described by Melzer in 1918.
