= Ischionodonta brasiliensis =

Scientific classification
- Kingdom: Animalia
- Phylum: Arthropoda
- Clade: Pancrustacea
- Class: Insecta
- Order: Coleoptera
- Suborder: Polyphaga
- Infraorder: Cucujiformia
- Family: Cerambycidae
- Genus: Ischionodonta
- Species: I. brasiliensis

Binomial name
- Ischionodonta brasiliensis (Chevrolat, 1859)

Species of beetle

Ischionodonta brasiliensis is a species of beetle in the family Cerambycidae. It was described by Chevrolat in 1859.
