= Gurubira =

Scientific classification
- Kingdom: Animalia
- Phylum: Arthropoda
- Class: Insecta
- Order: Coleoptera
- Suborder: Polyphaga
- Infraorder: Cucujiformia
- Family: Cerambycidae
- Subfamily: Cerambycinae
- Tribe: Rhopalophorini
- Genus: Gurubira; Napp & Marques, 1999

Genus of beetles

Gurubira is a genus of beetles in the family Cerambycidae, containing the following species:

- Gurubira apicalis (Fuchs, 1966)
- Gurubira atramentarius (White, 1855)
- Gurubira axillaris (Klug, 1825)
- Gurubira erythromos Napp & Marques, 1999
- Gurubira spectabilis (Martins & Napp, 1989)
- Gurubira tristis (Chevrolat, 1859)
- Gurubira violaceomaculatus (Gounelle, 1911)
