= Closteropus herteli =

Scientific classification
- Kingdom: Animalia
- Phylum: Arthropoda
- Class: Insecta
- Order: Coleoptera
- Suborder: Polyphaga
- Infraorder: Cucujiformia
- Family: Cerambycidae
- Genus: Closteropus
- Species: C. herteli

Binomial name
- Closteropus herteli Tippmann, 1960

Species of beetle

Closteropus herteli is a species of beetle in the family Cerambycidae. It was described by Tippmann in 1960.
