= Rhopalophora prorubra =

Scientific classification
- Kingdom: Animalia
- Phylum: Arthropoda
- Class: Insecta
- Order: Coleoptera
- Suborder: Polyphaga
- Infraorder: Cucujiformia
- Family: Cerambycidae
- Genus: Rhopalophora
- Species: R. prorubra

Binomial name
- Rhopalophora prorubra Knull, 1944

Species of beetle

Rhopalophora prorubra is a species of beetle in the family Cerambycidae. It was described by Knull in 1944.
