= Dirocoremia ingae =

Scientific classification
- Kingdom: Animalia
- Phylum: Arthropoda
- Clade: Pancrustacea
- Class: Insecta
- Order: Coleoptera
- Suborder: Polyphaga
- Infraorder: Cucujiformia
- Family: Cerambycidae
- Genus: Dirocoremia
- Species: D. ingae

Binomial name
- Dirocoremia ingae (Marques, 1994)

Species of beetle

Dirocoremia ingae is a species of beetle in the family Cerambycidae. It was described by Marques in 1994.
