= Dihammaphora ruficollis =

Scientific classification
- Domain: Eukaryota
- Kingdom: Animalia
- Phylum: Arthropoda
- Class: Insecta
- Order: Coleoptera
- Suborder: Polyphaga
- Infraorder: Cucujiformia
- Family: Cerambycidae
- Genus: Dihammaphora
- Species: D. ruficollis

Binomial name
- Dihammaphora ruficollis Chevrolat, 1859

Species of beetle

Dihammaphora ruficollis is a species of beetle in the family Cerambycidae. It was described by Chevrolat in 1859.
