= Gurubira axillaris =

Scientific classification
- Kingdom: Animalia
- Phylum: Arthropoda
- Class: Insecta
- Order: Coleoptera
- Suborder: Polyphaga
- Infraorder: Cucujiformia
- Family: Cerambycidae
- Genus: Gurubira
- Species: G. axillaris

Binomial name
- Gurubira axillaris (Klug, 1825)

Species of beetle

Gurubira axillaris is a species of beetle in the family Cerambycidae. It was described by Johann Christoph Friedrich Klug in 1825.
