= Cycnoderus guatemalicus =

Scientific classification
- Domain: Eukaryota
- Kingdom: Animalia
- Phylum: Arthropoda
- Class: Insecta
- Order: Coleoptera
- Suborder: Polyphaga
- Infraorder: Cucujiformia
- Family: Cerambycidae
- Genus: Cycnoderus
- Species: C. guatemalicus

Binomial name
- Cycnoderus guatemalicus Giesbert & Chemsak, 1993

Species of beetle

Cycnoderus guatemalicus is a species of beetle in the family Cerambycidae. It was described by Giesbert and Chemsak in 1993.
