= Dihammaphora parana =

Scientific classification
- Domain: Eukaryota
- Kingdom: Animalia
- Phylum: Arthropoda
- Class: Insecta
- Order: Coleoptera
- Suborder: Polyphaga
- Infraorder: Cucujiformia
- Family: Cerambycidae
- Genus: Dihammaphora
- Species: D. parana

Binomial name
- Dihammaphora parana (Gemminger, 1873)

Species of beetle

Dihammaphora parana is a species of beetle in the family Cerambycidae. It was described by Gemminger in 1873.
