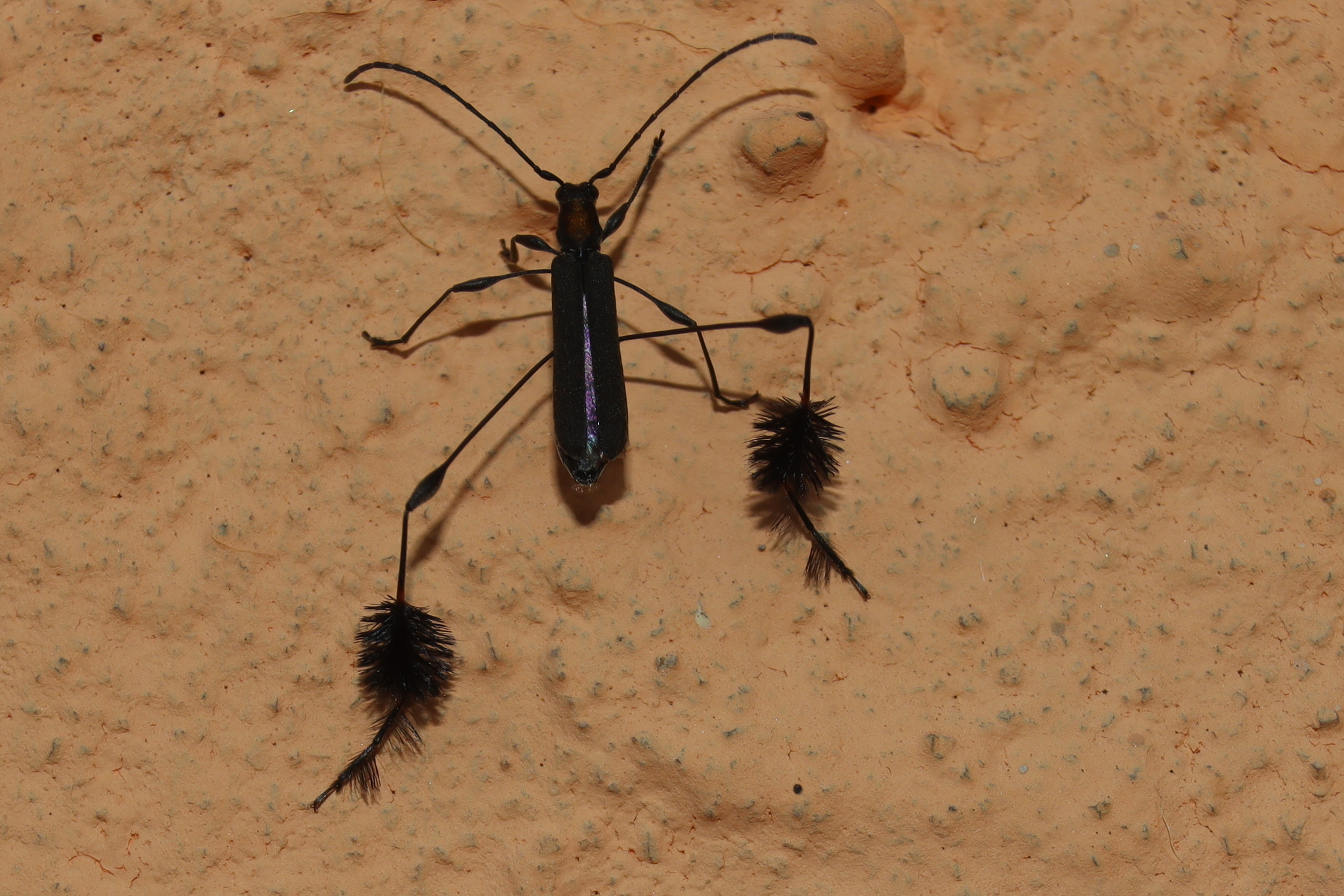
- Coremia plumipes

Scientific classification
- Kingdom: Animalia
- Phylum: Arthropoda
- Class: Insecta
- Order: Coleoptera
- Suborder: Polyphaga
- Infraorder: Cucujiformia
- Family: Cerambycidae
- Tribe: Rhopalophorini
- Genus: Coremia

= Coremia (beetle) =

Genus of beetles

Coremia is a genus of beetles in the family Cerambycidae, containing the following species:

- Coremia plumipes (Pallas, 1772)
- Coremia signaticollis Buquet in Guérin-Méneville, 1844
