= Rhopaliella bicolorata =

Scientific classification
- Kingdom: Animalia
- Phylum: Arthropoda
- Clade: Pancrustacea
- Class: Insecta
- Order: Coleoptera
- Suborder: Polyphaga
- Infraorder: Cucujiformia
- Family: Cerambycidae
- Genus: Rhopaliella
- Species: R. bicolorata

Binomial name
- Rhopaliella bicolorata (Monné, 1989)

Species of beetle

Rhopaliella bicolorata is a species of beetle in the family Cerambycidae. It was described by Monné in 1989.
