= Argyrodines =

Scientific classification
- Kingdom: Animalia
- Phylum: Arthropoda
- Class: Insecta
- Order: Coleoptera
- Suborder: Polyphaga
- Infraorder: Cucujiformia
- Family: Cerambycidae
- Tribe: Rhopalophorini
- Genus: Argyrodines

Genus of beetles

Argyrodines is a genus of beetles in the family Cerambycidae, containing the following species:

- Argyrodines aurivillii (Gounelle, 1905)
- Argyrodines pulchella Bates, 1867
