= Rhopalophora casignata =

Scientific classification
- Kingdom: Animalia
- Phylum: Arthropoda
- Class: Insecta
- Order: Coleoptera
- Suborder: Polyphaga
- Infraorder: Cucujiformia
- Family: Cerambycidae
- Genus: Rhopalophora
- Species: R. casignata

Binomial name
- Rhopalophora casignata Martins & Napp, 1989

Species of beetle

Rhopalophora casignata is a species of beetle in the family Cerambycidae. It was described by Martins and Napp in 1989.
