= Ischionodonta pustulosa =

Scientific classification
- Kingdom: Animalia
- Phylum: Arthropoda
- Clade: Pancrustacea
- Class: Insecta
- Order: Coleoptera
- Suborder: Polyphaga
- Infraorder: Cucujiformia
- Family: Cerambycidae
- Genus: Ischionodonta
- Species: I. pustulosa

Binomial name
- Ischionodonta pustulosa (White, 1855)

Species of beetle

Ischionodonta pustulosa is a species of beetle in the family Cerambycidae. It was described by White in 1855.
