= Parozodes =

Scientific classification
- Kingdom: Animalia
- Phylum: Arthropoda
- Clade: Pancrustacea
- Class: Insecta
- Order: Coleoptera
- Suborder: Polyphaga
- Infraorder: Cucujiformia
- Family: Cerambycidae
- Tribe: Rhopalophorini
- Genus: Parozodes

Genus of beetles

Parozodes is a genus of beetles in the family Cerambycidae, containing the following species:

- Parozodes erythrocephalus Aurivillius, 1897
- Parozodes pilosus Fuchs, 1956
