= Rhopalophora prolixa =

Scientific classification
- Kingdom: Animalia
- Phylum: Arthropoda
- Class: Insecta
- Order: Coleoptera
- Suborder: Polyphaga
- Infraorder: Cucujiformia
- Family: Cerambycidae
- Genus: Rhopalophora
- Species: R. prolixa

Binomial name
- Rhopalophora prolixa Monné, 1989

Species of beetle

Rhopalophora prolixa is a species of insect in the longhorn beetle family Cerambycidae. It was described by Monné in 1989. It is found in Brazil.
