= Gurubira violaceomaculatus =

Scientific classification
- Kingdom: Animalia
- Phylum: Arthropoda
- Clade: Pancrustacea
- Class: Insecta
- Order: Coleoptera
- Suborder: Polyphaga
- Infraorder: Cucujiformia
- Family: Cerambycidae
- Genus: Gurubira
- Species: G. violaceomaculatus

Binomial name
- Gurubira violaceomaculatus (Gounelle, 1911)

Species of beetle

Gurubira violaceomaculatus is a species of beetle in the family Cerambycidae. It was described by Gounelle in 1911.
