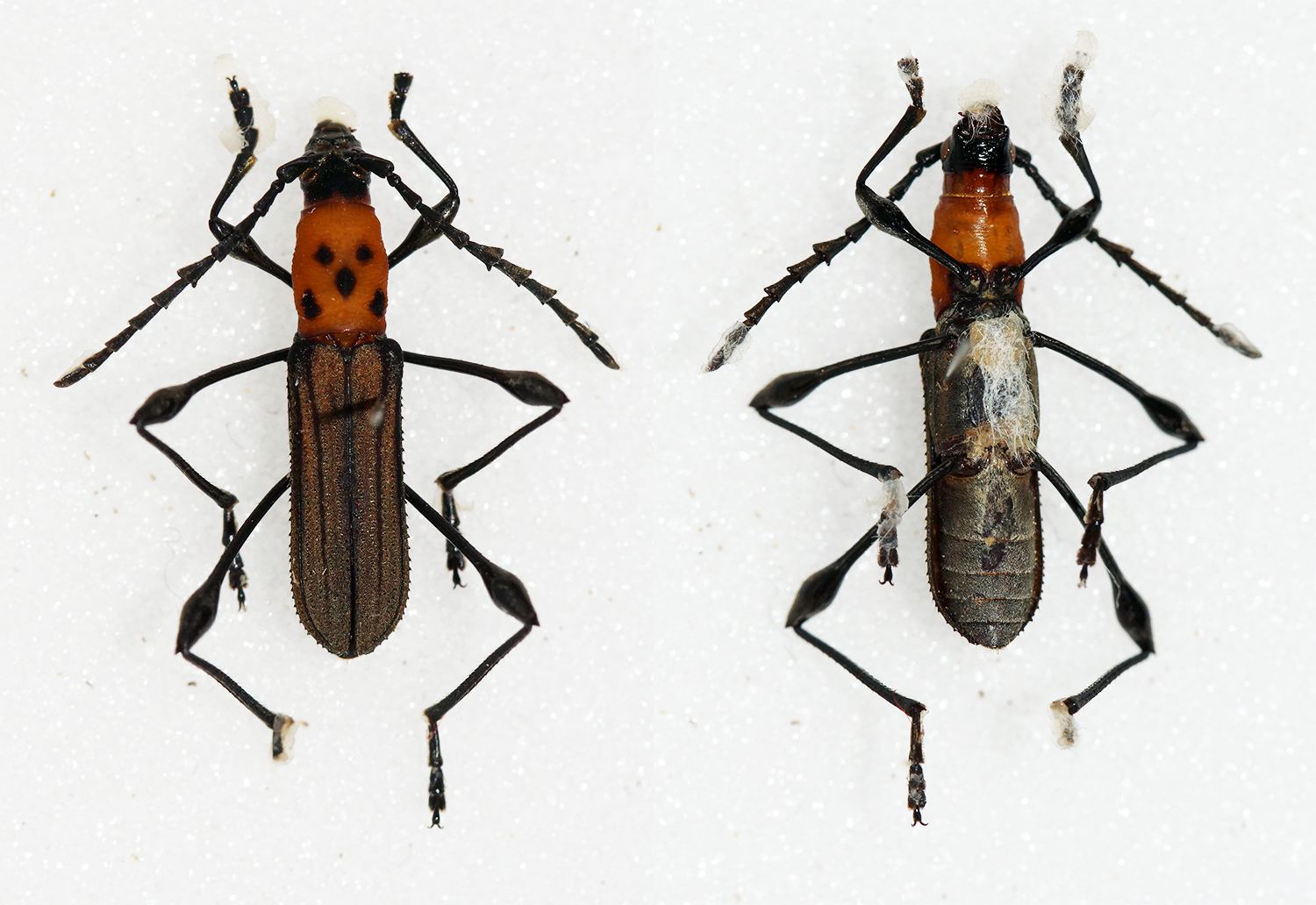
- Haenkea zischkai

Scientific classification
- Kingdom: Animalia
- Phylum: Arthropoda
- Class: Insecta
- Order: Coleoptera
- Suborder: Polyphaga
- Infraorder: Cucujiformia
- Family: Cerambycidae
- Tribe: Rhopalophorini
- Genus: Haenkea

= Haenkea =

Genus of beetles

Haenkea is a genus of beetles in the family Cerambycidae, containing the following species:

- Haenkea atra (Chevrolat, 1855)
- Haenkea thoracica (Chevrolat, 1855)
- Haenkea zischkai Tippmann, 1953
