= Argyrodines pulchella =

Scientific classification
- Kingdom: Animalia
- Phylum: Arthropoda
- Class: Insecta
- Order: Coleoptera
- Suborder: Polyphaga
- Infraorder: Cucujiformia
- Family: Cerambycidae
- Genus: Argyrodines
- Species: A. pulchella

Binomial name
- Argyrodines pulchella Bates, 1867

Species of beetle

Argyrodines pulchella is a species of beetle in the family Cerambycidae. It was described by Bates in 1867.
