= Rhopalophora rugicollis =

Scientific classification
- Kingdom: Animalia
- Phylum: Arthropoda
- Class: Insecta
- Order: Coleoptera
- Suborder: Polyphaga
- Infraorder: Cucujiformia
- Family: Cerambycidae
- Genus: Rhopalophora
- Species: R. rugicollis

Binomial name
- Rhopalophora rugicollis (LeConte, 1858)

Species of beetle

Rhopalophora rugicollis is a species of beetle in the family Cerambycidae. It was described by John Lawrence LeConte in 1858.
