= Thalusia =

Scientific classification
- Kingdom: Animalia
- Phylum: Arthropoda
- Class: Insecta
- Order: Coleoptera
- Suborder: Polyphaga
- Infraorder: Cucujiformia
- Family: Cerambycidae
- Tribe: Rhopalophorini
- Genus: Thalusia

Genus of beetles

Thalusia is a genus of beetles in the family Cerambycidae, containing the following species:

- Thalusia atrata (Melzer, 1918)
- Thalusia erythromera (Audinet-Serville, 1834)
