= Dihammaphoroides jaufferti =

Scientific classification
- Kingdom: Animalia
- Phylum: Arthropoda
- Clade: Pancrustacea
- Class: Insecta
- Order: Coleoptera
- Suborder: Polyphaga
- Infraorder: Cucujiformia
- Family: Cerambycidae
- Genus: Dihammaphoroides
- Species: D. jaufferti

Binomial name
- Dihammaphoroides jaufferti Galileo & Martins, 2003

Species of beetle

Dihammaphoroides jaufferti is a species of beetle in the family Cerambycidae. It was described by Galileo and Martins in 2003.
