= Dirocoremia bruchi =

Scientific classification
- Kingdom: Animalia
- Phylum: Arthropoda
- Clade: Pancrustacea
- Class: Insecta
- Order: Coleoptera
- Suborder: Polyphaga
- Infraorder: Cucujiformia
- Family: Cerambycidae
- Genus: Dirocoremia
- Species: D. bruchi

Binomial name
- Dirocoremia bruchi (Gounelle, 1905)

Species of beetle

Dirocoremia bruchi is a species of beetle in the family Cerambycidae. It was described by Gounelle in 1905.
