= Rhopalophora baracoana =

Scientific classification
- Kingdom: Animalia
- Phylum: Arthropoda
- Class: Insecta
- Order: Coleoptera
- Suborder: Polyphaga
- Infraorder: Cucujiformia
- Family: Cerambycidae
- Genus: Rhopalophora
- Species: R. baracoana

Binomial name
- Rhopalophora baracoana Zayas, 1975

Species of beetle

Rhopalophora baracoana is a species of beetle in the family Cerambycidae. It was described by Zayas in 1975.
