= Rhopalophora paraensis =

Scientific classification
- Kingdom: Animalia
- Phylum: Arthropoda
- Class: Insecta
- Order: Coleoptera
- Suborder: Polyphaga
- Infraorder: Cucujiformia
- Family: Cerambycidae
- Genus: Rhopalophora
- Species: R. paraensis

Binomial name
- Rhopalophora paraensis Martins & Napp, 1989

Species of beetle

Rhopalophora paraensis is a species of beetle in the family Cerambycidae. It was described by Martins and Napp in 1989.
