= Listroptera carbonaria =

Scientific classification
- Kingdom: Animalia
- Phylum: Arthropoda
- Clade: Pancrustacea
- Class: Insecta
- Order: Coleoptera
- Suborder: Polyphaga
- Infraorder: Cucujiformia
- Family: Cerambycidae
- Genus: Listroptera
- Species: L. carbonaria

Binomial name
- Listroptera carbonaria Chevrolat, 1855

Species of beetle

Listroptera carbonaria is a species of beetle in the family Cerambycidae. It was described by Chevrolat in 1855.
