= Rhopaliella =

Scientific classification
- Kingdom: Animalia
- Phylum: Arthropoda
- Class: Insecta
- Order: Coleoptera
- Suborder: Polyphaga
- Infraorder: Cucujiformia
- Family: Cerambycidae
- Tribe: Rhopalophorini
- Genus: Rhopaliella

Genus of beetles

Rhopaliella is a genus of beetles in the family Cerambycidae, containing the following species:

- Rhopaliella bicolorata (Monné, 1989)
- Rhopaliella discicollis (Chevrolat, 1859)
