= Dirocoremia =

Scientific classification
- Kingdom: Animalia
- Phylum: Arthropoda
- Clade: Pancrustacea
- Class: Insecta
- Order: Coleoptera
- Suborder: Polyphaga
- Infraorder: Cucujiformia
- Family: Cerambycidae
- Tribe: Rhopalophorini
- Genus: Dirocoremia

Genus of beetles

Dirocoremia is a genus of beetles in the family Cerambycidae, containing the following species:

- Dirocoremia bruchi (Gounelle, 1905)
- Dirocoremia ingae (Marques, 1994)
- Dirocoremia simplicipes (Gounelle, 1911)
