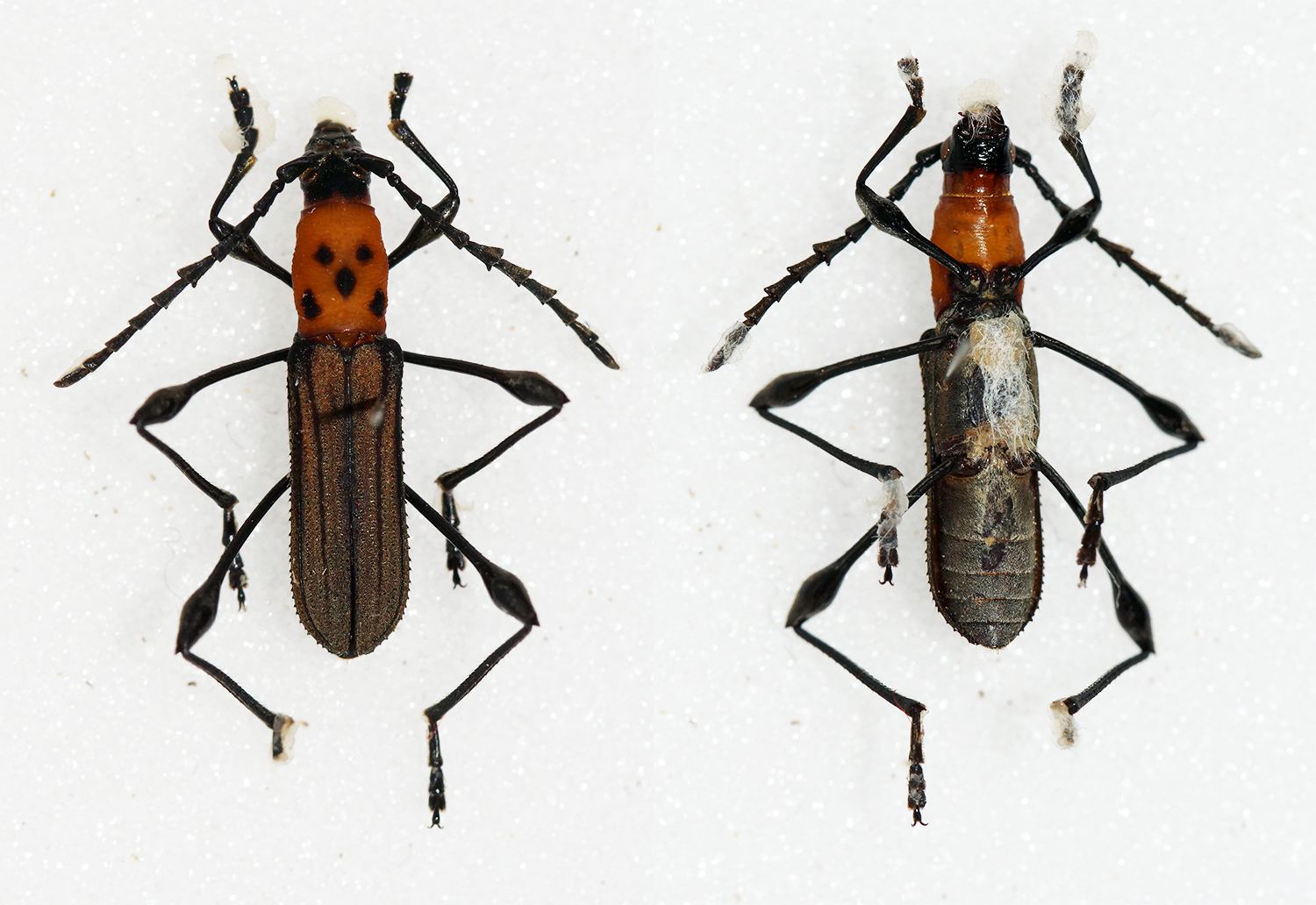

Scientific classification
- Kingdom: Animalia
- Phylum: Arthropoda
- Clade: Pancrustacea
- Class: Insecta
- Order: Coleoptera
- Suborder: Polyphaga
- Infraorder: Cucujiformia
- Family: Cerambycidae
- Genus: Haenkea
- Species: H. zischkai

Binomial name
- Haenkea zischkai Tippmann, 1953

= Haenkea zischkai =

Species of beetle

Haenkea zischkai is a species of beetle in the family Cerambycidae. It was described by Tippmann in 1953.
