= Rhopalophora eximia =

Scientific classification
- Kingdom: Animalia
- Phylum: Arthropoda
- Clade: Pancrustacea
- Class: Insecta
- Order: Coleoptera
- Suborder: Polyphaga
- Infraorder: Cucujiformia
- Family: Cerambycidae
- Genus: Rhopalophora
- Species: R. eximia

Binomial name
- Rhopalophora eximia Bates, 1892

Species of beetle

Rhopalophora eximia is a species of beetle in the family Cerambycidae. It was described by Henry Walter Bates in 1892.
