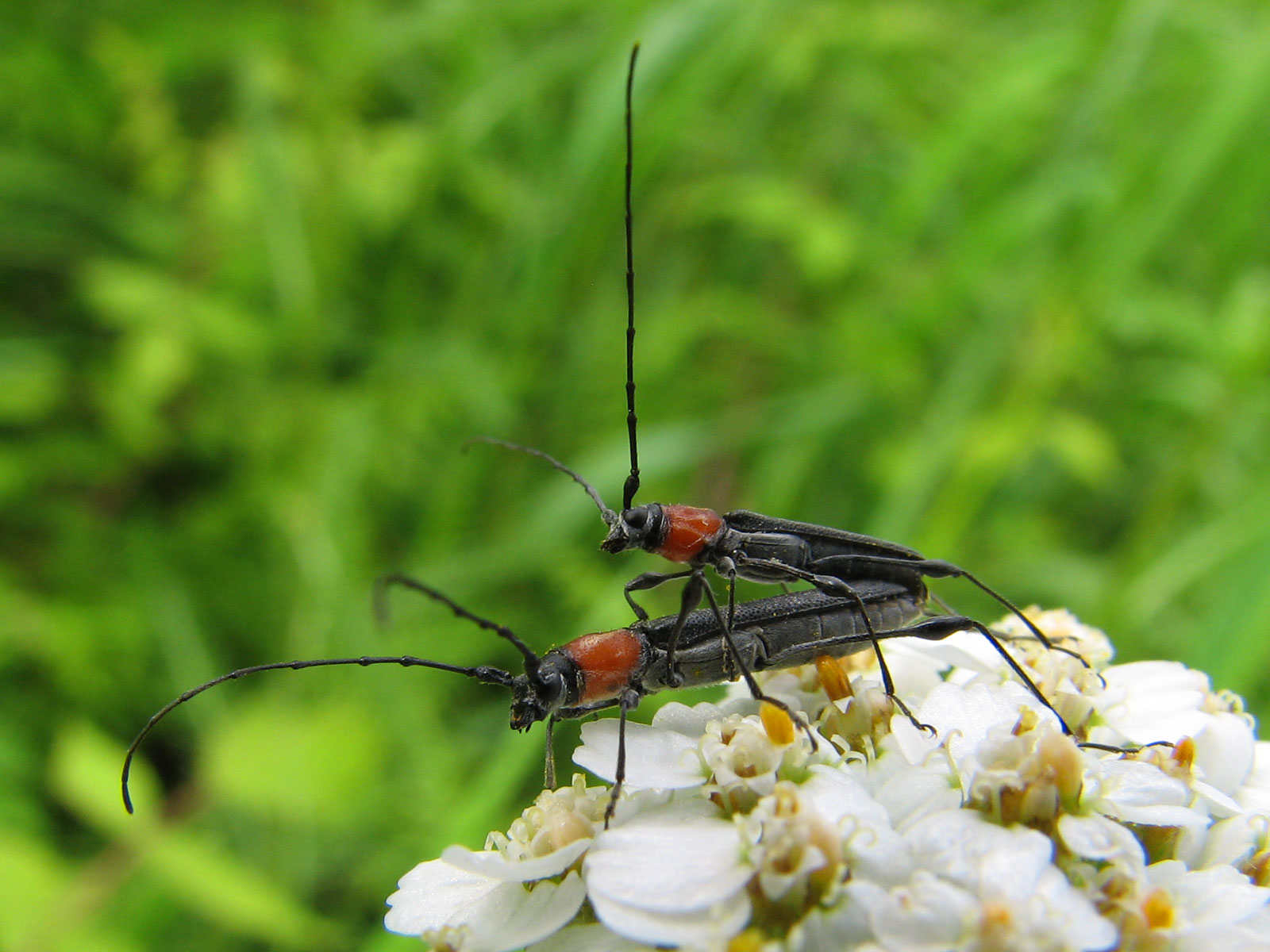

Scientific classification
- Kingdom: Animalia
- Phylum: Arthropoda
- Class: Insecta
- Order: Coleoptera
- Suborder: Polyphaga
- Infraorder: Cucujiformia
- Family: Cerambycidae
- Genus: Rhopalophora
- Species: R. meeskei

Binomial name
- Rhopalophora meeskei Casey, 1891

= Rhopalophora meeskei =

Species of beetle

Rhopalophora meeskei is a species of beetle in the family Cerambycidae. It was described by Casey in 1891.
