= Rhopalophora rubecula =

Scientific classification
- Kingdom: Animalia
- Phylum: Arthropoda
- Clade: Pancrustacea
- Class: Insecta
- Order: Coleoptera
- Suborder: Polyphaga
- Infraorder: Cucujiformia
- Family: Cerambycidae
- Genus: Rhopalophora
- Species: R. rubecula

Binomial name
- Rhopalophora rubecula Bates, 1880

Species of beetle

Rhopalophora rubecula is a species of beetle in the family Cerambycidae. It was described by Henry Walter Bates in 1880.
