= Potiapua =

Potiapua antonia

Scientific classification
- Kingdom: Animalia
- Phylum: Arthropoda
- Clade: Pancrustacea
- Class: Insecta
- Order: Coleoptera
- Suborder: Polyphaga
- Infraorder: Cucujiformia
- Family: Cerambycidae
- Genus: Potiapua
- Species: P. antonia

Binomial name
- Potiapua antonia Napp & Monne, 2009

Genus of beetles

Potiapua antonia is a species of beetle in the family Cerambycidae, the only species in the genus Potiapua.
