= Disaulax =

Disaulax hirsuticornis

Scientific classification
- Kingdom: Animalia
- Phylum: Arthropoda
- Class: Insecta
- Order: Coleoptera
- Suborder: Polyphaga
- Infraorder: Cucujiformia
- Family: Cerambycidae
- Genus: Disaulax
- Species: D. hirsuticornis

Binomial name
- Disaulax hirsuticornis (Kirby, 1818)

Genus of beetles

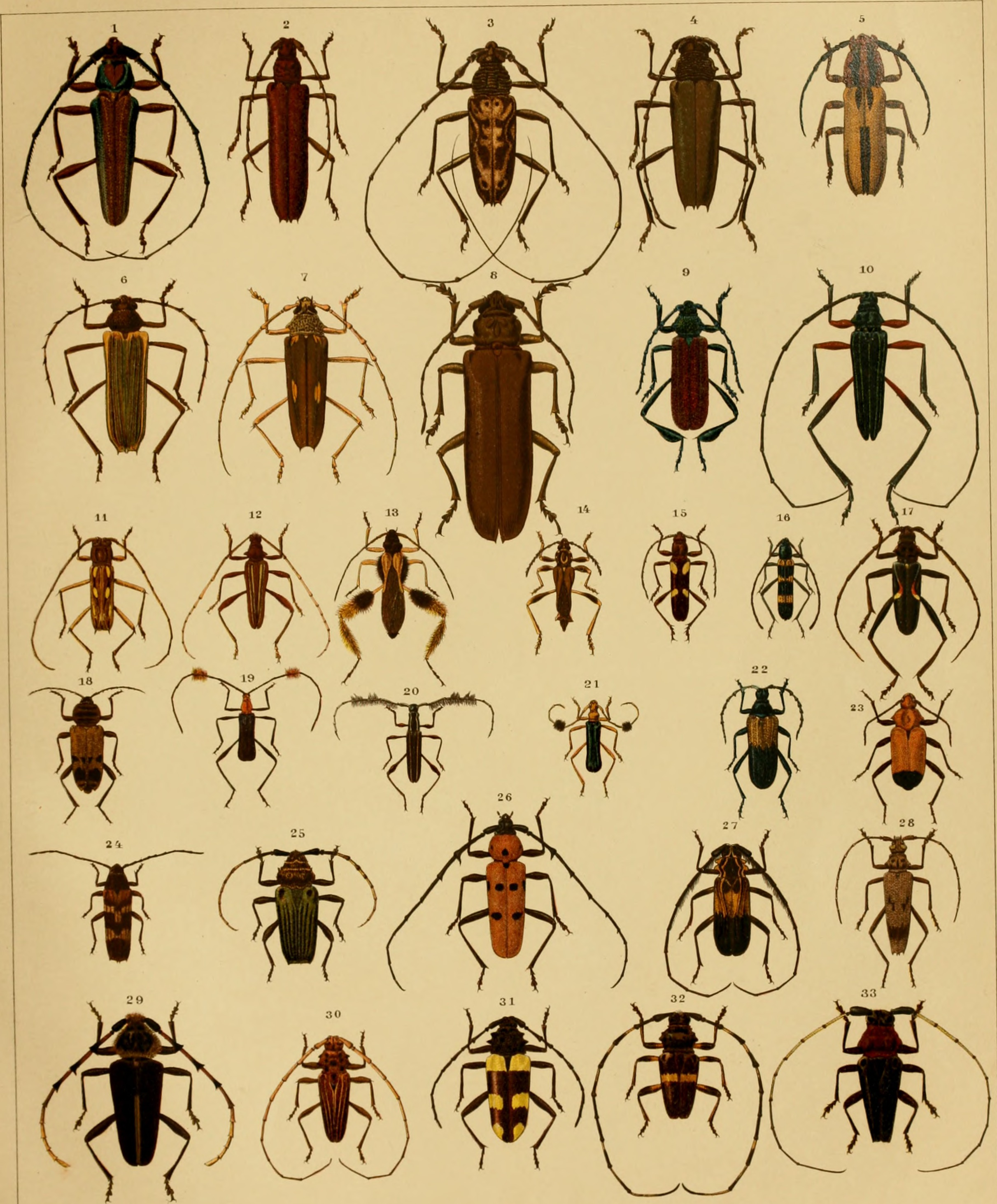

Disaulax hirsuticornis is a species of beetle in the family Cerambycidae, the only species in the genus Disaulax.
