= Brachylophora =

Brachylophora auricollis

Scientific classification
- Kingdom: Animalia
- Phylum: Arthropoda
- Class: Insecta
- Order: Coleoptera
- Suborder: Polyphaga
- Infraorder: Cucujiformia
- Family: Cerambycidae
- Genus: Brachylophora
- Species: B. auricollis

Binomial name
- Brachylophora auricollis (Bruch, 1918)

Genus of beetles

Brachylophora auricollis is a species of beetle in the family Cerambycidae, the only species in the genus Brachylophora.
