= Rhopalophora miniatocollis =

Scientific classification
- Kingdom: Animalia
- Phylum: Arthropoda
- Class: Insecta
- Order: Coleoptera
- Suborder: Polyphaga
- Infraorder: Cucujiformia
- Family: Cerambycidae
- Genus: Rhopalophora
- Species: R. miniatocollis

Binomial name
- Rhopalophora miniatocollis Chevrolat, 1859

Species of beetle

Rhopalophora miniatocollis is a species of beetle in the family Cerambycidae. It was described by Chevrolat in 1859.
