= Meringodes =

Meringodes solangeae

Scientific classification
- Kingdom: Animalia
- Phylum: Arthropoda
- Clade: Pancrustacea
- Class: Insecta
- Order: Coleoptera
- Suborder: Polyphaga
- Infraorder: Cucujiformia
- Family: Cerambycidae
- Genus: Meringodes
- Species: M. solangeae

Binomial name
- Meringodes solangeae Wappes & Lingafelter, 2011

Genus of beetles

Meringodes solangeae is a species of beetle in the family Cerambycidae, the only species in the genus Meringodes.
