= Merocoremia =

Merocoremia monnei

Scientific classification
- Kingdom: Animalia
- Phylum: Arthropoda
- Clade: Pancrustacea
- Class: Insecta
- Order: Coleoptera
- Suborder: Polyphaga
- Infraorder: Cucujiformia
- Family: Cerambycidae
- Genus: Merocoremia
- Species: M. monnei

Binomial name
- Merocoremia monnei Marques, 1994

Genus of beetles

Merocoremia monnei is a species of beetle in the family Cerambycidae, the only species in the genus Merocoremia.
