= Gurubira spectabilis =

Scientific classification
- Kingdom: Animalia
- Phylum: Arthropoda
- Class: Insecta
- Order: Coleoptera
- Suborder: Polyphaga
- Infraorder: Cucujiformia
- Family: Cerambycidae
- Genus: Gurubira
- Species: G. spectabilis

Binomial name
- Gurubira spectabilis (Martins & Napp, 1989)

Species of beetle

Gurubira spectabilis is a species of beetle in the family Cerambycidae. It was described by Martins and Napp in 1989.
