= Ischionodonta =

Scientific classification
- Kingdom: Animalia
- Phylum: Arthropoda
- Clade: Pancrustacea
- Class: Insecta
- Order: Coleoptera
- Suborder: Polyphaga
- Infraorder: Cucujiformia
- Family: Cerambycidae
- Genus: Ischionodonta

Genus of beetles

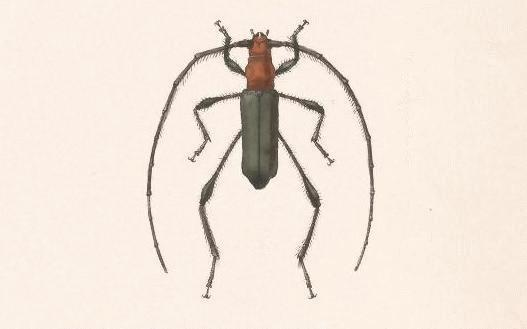

Ischionodonta is a genus of beetles in the family Cerambycidae, containing the following species:

- Ischionodonta amazona (Chevrolat, 1859)
- Ischionodonta brasiliensis (Chevrolat, 1859)
- Ischionodonta colombiana Napp & Marques, 1999
- Ischionodonta earina Napp & Marques, 1998
- Ischionodonta iridipennis (Chevrolat, 1859)
- Ischionodonta lansbergei (Lameere, 1884)
- Ischionodonta mexicana Giesbert & Chemsak, 1993
- Ischionodonta paraibensis Napp & Marques, 1998
- Ischionodonta platensis (Chevrolat, 1859)
- Ischionodonta pustulosa (White, 1855)
- Ischionodonta rufomarginata (Fisher, 1937)
- Ischionodonta semirubra (Burmeister, 1865)
- Ischionodonta serratula Napp & Marques, 1999
- Ischionodonta serripes (Bates, 1872)
- Ischionodonta smaragdina (Martins & Napp, 1989)
- Ischionodonta spinicornis (Zajciw, 1970)
- Ischionodonta torquata (Chevrolat, 1859)
- Ischionodonta versicolor (Chevrolat, 1859)
- Ischionodonta viridinigra Napp & Marques, 1998
