= Muxbalia =

Muxbalia monzoni

Scientific classification
- Kingdom: Animalia
- Phylum: Arthropoda
- Clade: Pancrustacea
- Class: Insecta
- Order: Coleoptera
- Suborder: Polyphaga
- Infraorder: Cucujiformia
- Family: Cerambycidae
- Genus: Muxbalia
- Species: M. monzoni

Binomial name
- Muxbalia monzoni Giesbert & Chemsak, 1993

Genus of beetles

Muxbalia monzoni is a species of beetle in the family Cerambycidae, the only species in the genus Muxbalia.
