= Rhopalophorella =

Rhopalophorella fasciata

Scientific classification
- Kingdom: Animalia
- Phylum: Arthropoda
- Clade: Pancrustacea
- Class: Insecta
- Order: Coleoptera
- Suborder: Polyphaga
- Infraorder: Cucujiformia
- Family: Cerambycidae
- Genus: Rhopalophorella
- Species: R. fasciata

Binomial name
- Rhopalophorella fasciata (LeConte, 1873)

Genus of beetles

Rhopalophorella fasciata is a species of beetle in the family Cerambycidae, the only species in the genus Rhopalophorella.
