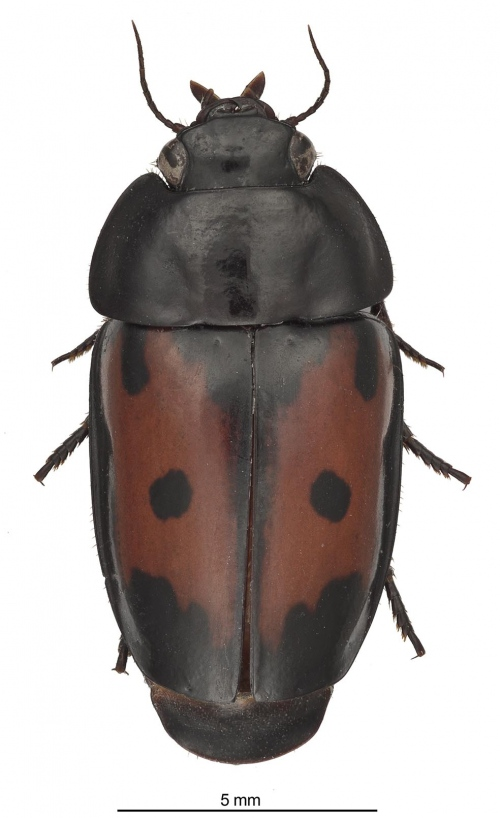
- Guyanemorpha spectabilis female holotype

Scientific classification
- Domain: Eukaryota
- Kingdom: Animalia
- Phylum: Arthropoda
- Class: Insecta
- Order: Coleoptera
- Suborder: Adephaga
- Family: Carabidae
- Genus: Guyanemorpha; Erwin, 2013
- Species: G. spectabilis

Binomial name
- Guyanemorpha spectabilis Erwin, 2013

= Guyanemorpha =

Genus of beetles

Guyanemorpha is a genus of beetles, the Guyane False-form beetles, in the family Carabidae. It contains one known species, the Spectacular Guyane False-form beetle, (Guyanemorpha spectabilis), which was found in French Guiana and first described in 2013 by Terry L. Erwin in the open access journal ZooKeys. It was discovered during a survey of the country's insects by the Entomological Society Antilles-Guyane (SEAG).

Little is known about the species' behaviour, other than that it lives in lowland rainforest. Related species cohabit with ants, and it is thought likely that G. spectabilis will do so also.

The holotype is currently held in trust at the National Museum of Natural History, part of the Smithsonian Institution, Washington, D.C., until the planned Natural History Museum of Guyane is established, and at that time, the specimen will be transferred there.
