= Aguassay =

Aguassay collaris

Scientific classification
- Kingdom: Animalia
- Phylum: Arthropoda
- Class: Insecta
- Order: Coleoptera
- Suborder: Polyphaga
- Infraorder: Cucujiformia
- Family: Cerambycidae
- Genus: Aguassay
- Species: A. collaris

Binomial name
- Aguassay collaris (Klug, 1825)

Genus of beetles

Aguassay is a genus of beetles in the family Cerambycidae, containing a single species, Aguassay collaris.
