= Neozodes =

Neozodes signatus

Scientific classification
- Kingdom: Animalia
- Phylum: Arthropoda
- Clade: Pancrustacea
- Class: Insecta
- Order: Coleoptera
- Suborder: Polyphaga
- Infraorder: Cucujiformia
- Family: Cerambycidae
- Genus: Neozodes
- Species: N. signatus

Binomial name
- Neozodes signatus Zajciw, 1958

Genus of beetles

Neozodes signatus is a species of beetle in the family Cerambycidae, the only species in the genus Neozodes.
