= Guzmania spectabilis =

Scientific classification
- Kingdom: Plantae
- Clade: Tracheophytes
- Clade: Angiosperms
- Clade: Monocots
- Clade: Commelinids
- Order: Poales
- Family: Bromeliaceae
- Genus: Guzmania
- Species: G. spectabilis

Binomial name
- Guzmania spectabilis (Mez & Wercklé) J. Utley

Species of flowering plant

Guzmania spectabilis is a plant species in the genus Guzmania. This species is native to Costa Rica and Ecuador.

== Bibliography ==
- Luther, Harry E. (1995). "An Annotated Checklist of the Bromeliaceae of Costa Rica". Selbyana. 16 (2): 230–234. ISSN 0361-185X. JSTOR 41759911.
- Luther, H.E. (1999). "Bromeliaceae". In Jørgensen, P.M.; León-Yánez, S. (eds.). Catalogue of the vascular plants of Ecuador = Catálogo de las plantas vasculares del Ecuador (PDF). St. Louis, Mo.: Missouri Botanical Garden Press. pp. 337–361. ISBN 978-0915279609. Archived from the original (PDF) on 26 September 2006.
