= Rhopalophora punctatipennis =

Scientific classification
- Kingdom: Animalia
- Phylum: Arthropoda
- Class: Insecta
- Order: Coleoptera
- Suborder: Polyphaga
- Infraorder: Cucujiformia
- Family: Cerambycidae
- Genus: Rhopalophora
- Species: R. punctatipennis

Binomial name
- Rhopalophora punctatipennis Linsley, 1935

Species of beetle

Rhopalophora punctatipennis is a species of beetle in the family Cerambycidae. It was described by Linsley in 1935.
