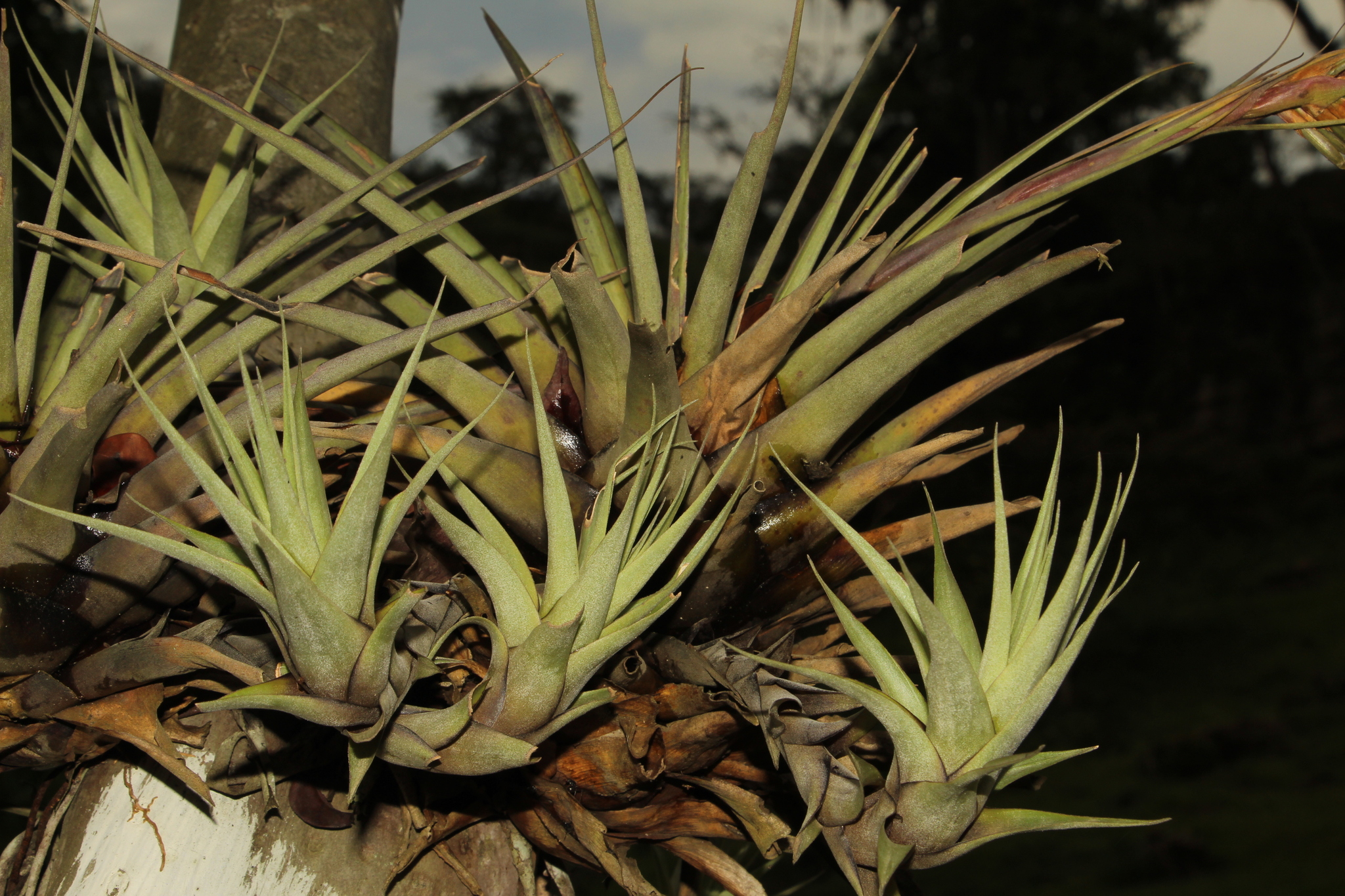
- T. myriantha

Scientific classification
- Kingdom: Plantae
- Clade: Tracheophytes
- Clade: Angiosperms
- Clade: Monocots
- Clade: Commelinids
- Order: Poales
- Family: Bromeliaceae
- Genus: Tillandsia
- Subgenus: Tillandsia subg. Pseudovriesea; Barfuss & W.Till

Species
- See text

= Tillandsia subg. Pseudovriesea =

Subgenus of flowering plants

Tillandsia subg. Pseudovriesea is a subgenus of the genus Tillandsia.

== Species ==
Species accepted by Encyclopedia of Bromeliads as of October 2022:

- Tillandsia andreettae (Rauh) J.R.Grant
- Tillandsia arpocalyx André
- Tillandsia barclayana Baker
- Tillandsia barthlottii Rauh
- Tillandsia boeghii (H.Luther) J.R.Grant
- Tillandsia castaneobulbosa Mez & Wercklé
- Tillandsia cereicola Mez
- Tillandsia chontalensis Baker
- Tillandsia crenulipetala Mez
- Tillandsia curvispica (Rauh) J.R.Grant
- Tillandsia didistichoides Mez
- Tillandsia drewii (L.B.Sm.) J.R.Grant
- Tillandsia engleriana Wittm.
- Tillandsia espinosae L.B.Sm.
- Tillandsia fragrans André
- Tillandsia hansonii Manzanares & Gouda
- Tillandsia harmsiana L.B.Sm.
- Tillandsia heterandra André
- Tillandsia hitchcockiana L.B.Sm.
- Tillandsia incurva Griseb.
- Tillandsia karinae Manzan., Gouda & Raack
- Tillandsia kentii (H.Luther & K.F.Norton) Manzanares & W.Till
- Tillandsia kickae Raack, Manzan. & Gouda
- Tillandsia limonensis (Rauh) J.R.Grant
- Tillandsia myriantha Baker
- Tillandsia olmosana (L.B.Sm.) J.R.Grant
- Tillandsia patula Mez
- Tillandsia penduliscapa (Rauh) J.R.Grant
- Tillandsia pereziana André
- Tillandsia peruviana J.R.Grant
- Tillandsia petraea L.B.Sm.
- Tillandsia porphyrocraspeda J.R.Grant
- Tillandsia robusta Griseb.
- Tillandsia spathacea Mez & Sodiro
- Tillandsia strobeliae (Rauh) J.R.Grant
- Tillandsia tequendamae André
- Tillandsia tillandsioides (L.B.Sm.) J.R.Grant
- Tillandsia werneriana J.R.Grant
- Tillandsia yaconorensis J.R.Grant
