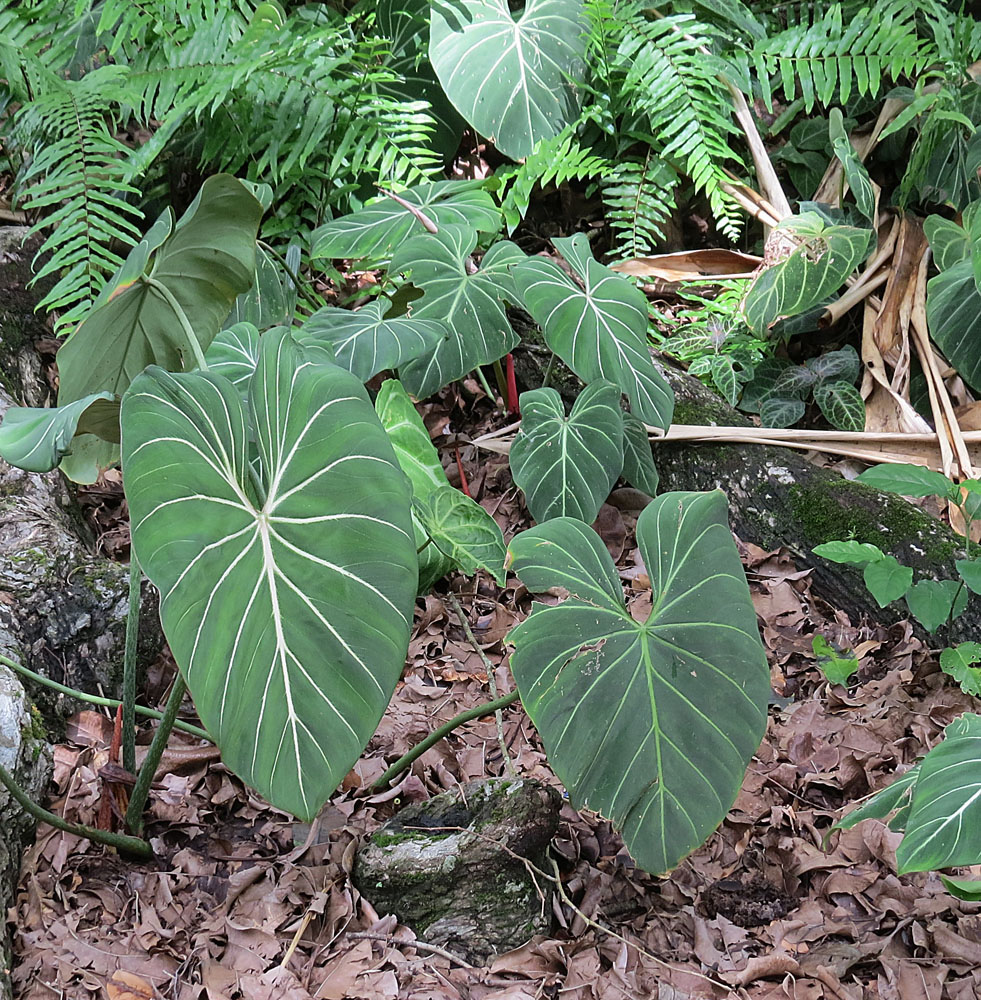
- P. gloriosum at Parque Municipal Summit, Panama, displaying typical horizontal, terrestrial growth habit. The species anchors to fallen trees, logs, roots and rocks, using accumulated leaves and plant detritus as nutrition.

Conservation status
- Vulnerable (IUCN 3.1)

Scientific classification
- Kingdom: Plantae
- Clade: Tracheophytes
- Clade: Angiosperms
- Clade: Monocots
- Order: Alismatales
- Family: Araceae
- Genus: Philodendron
- Species: P. gloriosum

Binomial name
- Philodendron gloriosum André

Synonyms
- Anthurium gloriosum K.Krause

= Philodendron gloriosum =

Species of plant

Philodendron gloriosum is a species of philodendron, a genus of tropical flowering plants in the arum family, Araceae, known primarily from Colombia. Popular in cultivation worldwide, this species' distinctive, green foliage is characterized by a large, cordate (heart-shaped) form, velutinous (velvety) texture, pink leaf margins, and striking pale-green to white or pink-tinted veins (especially in emergent or younger leaves).

Within the genus Philodendron, there seems to be three or four primary growth habits, or forms, of plants: epiphytic (lianas and vines that climb up trees), "self-heading" or rosette-types (such as P. erubescens), tree-types (such as Thaumatophyllum), and fully- or semi-hemiepiphytic (or "crawling" types, such as P. gloriosum). The latter types spend all, or most, of their lives growing horizontally, across the forest floor, over exposed tree roots or logs, as opposed to climbing vertically, directly up trees, as other Philodendron and Araceae species tend to do in their search for higher light exposure (such as P. hederaceum, or 'Heartleaf Philodendron'). Rather, P. gloriosum develops a "creeping", crawling growth habit as its root nodes adhere the plant's ever-lengthening stem to fallen trees, large roots (such as certain species of Ficus), and even rocks.

== See also ==
- List of Philodendron species

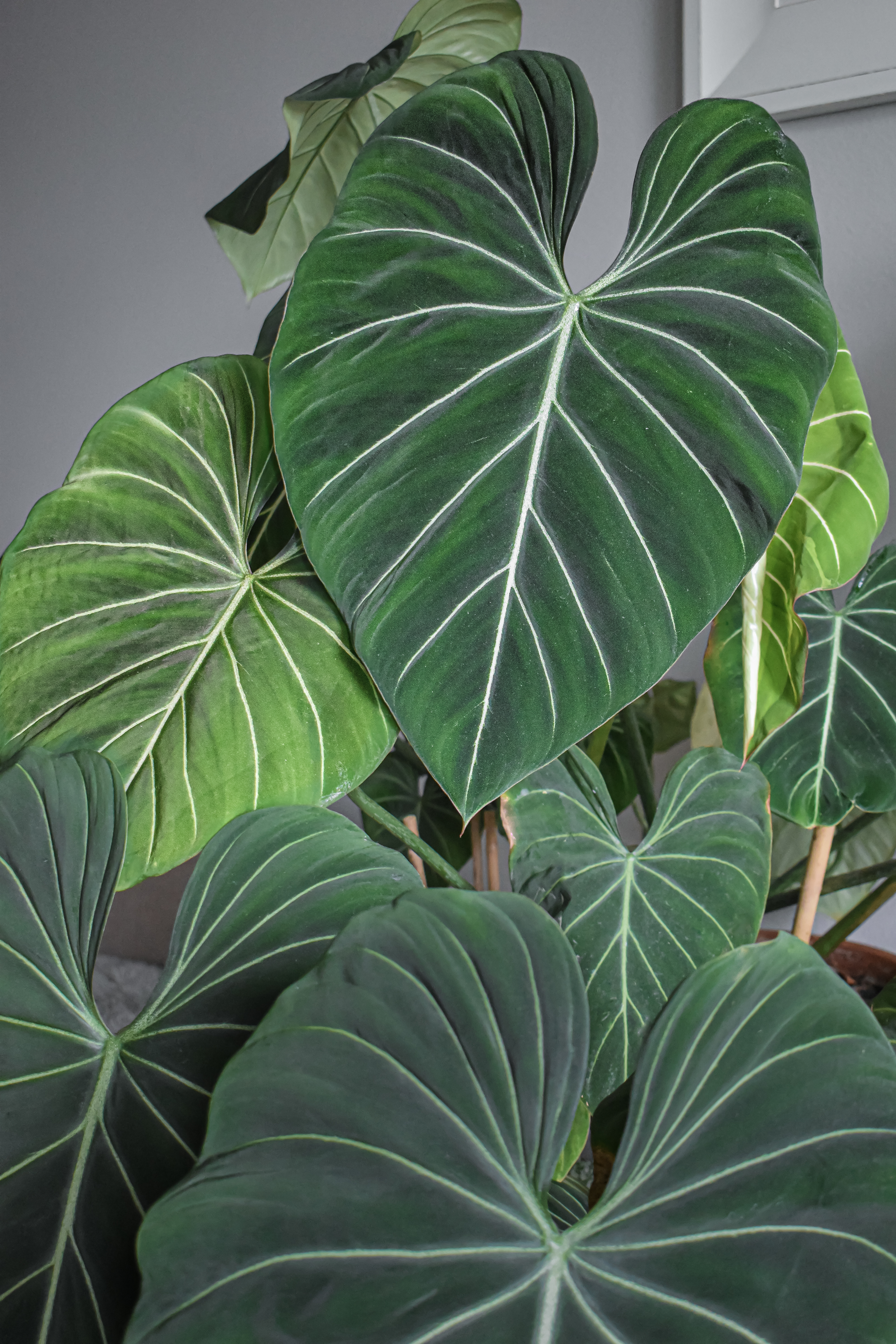
Mature plant growing indoors, medium high lighting: showing transition of color with age
