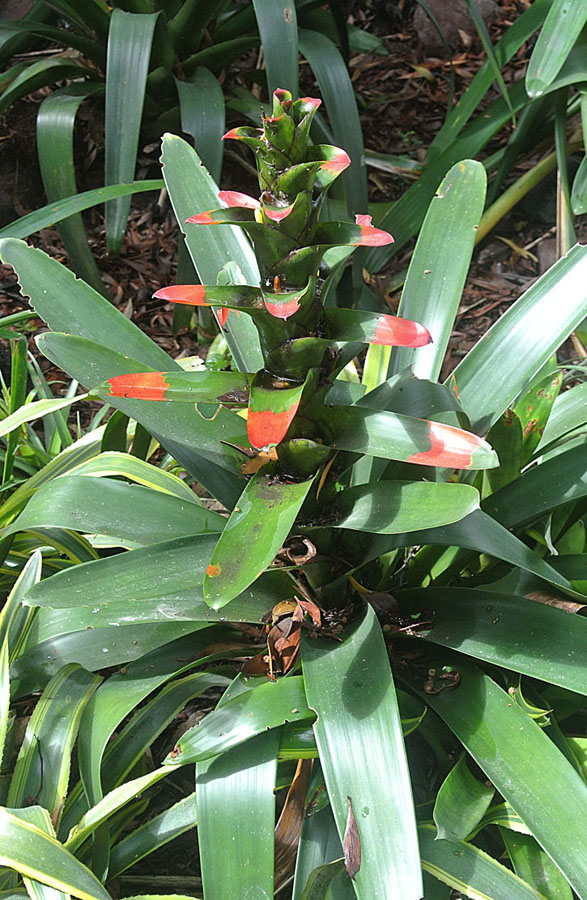
- Photo from Quito Botanical Gardens.

Scientific classification
- Kingdom: Plantae
- Clade: Tracheophytes
- Clade: Angiosperms
- Clade: Monocots
- Clade: Commelinids
- Order: Poales
- Family: Bromeliaceae
- Genus: Guzmania
- Species: G. gloriosa

Binomial name
- Guzmania gloriosa (André) André ex Mez

Synonyms
- Caraguata gloriosa André; Guzmania columnaris Mez & Sodiro; Thecophyllum gloriosum (André) Mez; Thecophyllum sceptrum Mez

= Guzmania gloriosa =

Species of plant

Guzmania gloriosa is a species of flowering plant in the Bromeliaceae family. It is native to Bolivia and Ecuador.
