= Red emerald =

Red emerald may refer to:

- Red beryl, marketed as red emerald, a gemstone
- Philodendron erubescens, or Red Emerald, a cultivar of flowering plant
