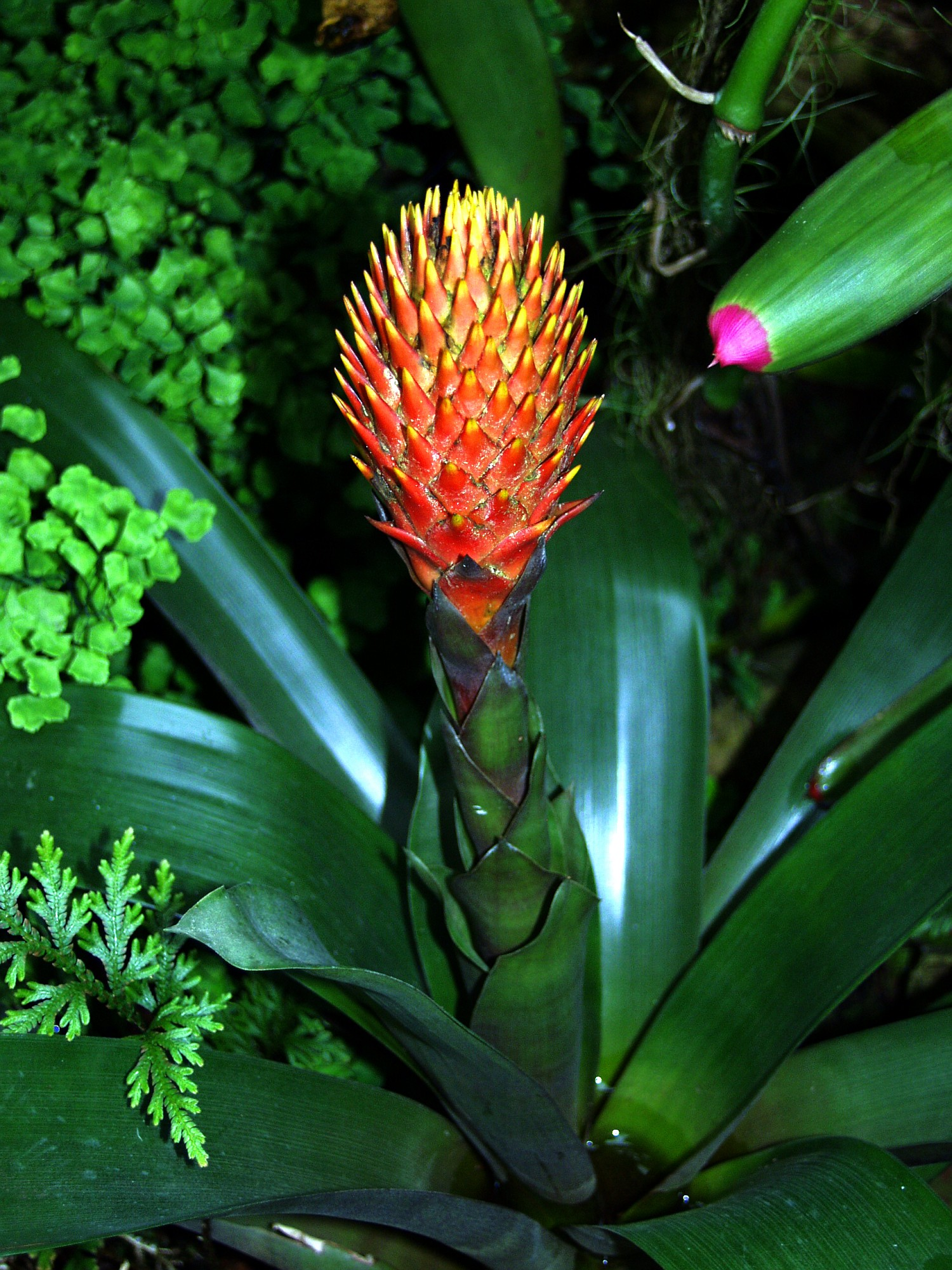

Scientific classification
- Kingdom: Plantae
- Clade: Tracheophytes
- Clade: Angiosperms
- Clade: Monocots
- Clade: Commelinids
- Order: Poales
- Family: Bromeliaceae
- Genus: Guzmania
- Species: G. conifera

Binomial name
- Guzmania conifera (André) André ex Mez

Synonyms
- Caraguata conifera André

= Guzmania conifera =

Species of plant

Guzmania conifera is a species of flowering plant in the Bromeliaceae family. It is native to Ecuador and Peru.

== Cultivars ==
- Guzmania 'Candy Corn'
- Guzmania 'Equator'
- Guzmania 'Graaf Van Hoorn'
- Guzmania 'Lollipop'
- Guzmania 'Torch'
