= Pitcairnia reflexiflora =

Conservation status
- Endangered (IUCN 3.1)

Scientific classification
- Kingdom: Plantae
- Clade: Tracheophytes
- Clade: Angiosperms
- Clade: Monocots
- Clade: Commelinids
- Order: Poales
- Family: Bromeliaceae
- Genus: Pitcairnia
- Species: P. reflexiflora

Binomial name
- Pitcairnia reflexiflora Andrè

Synonyms
- Hepetis reflexiflora (André) Mez; Pitcairnia reflexiflora var. longipetala E.Gross & Rauh; Pitcairnia reflexiflora var. minor L.B.Sm. & Read

Species of flowering plant

Pitcairnia reflexiflora is a species of flowering plant in the family Bromeliaceae. It is endemic to Ecuador. Its natural habitat is subtropical or tropical moist montane forests. It is threatened by habitat loss.
