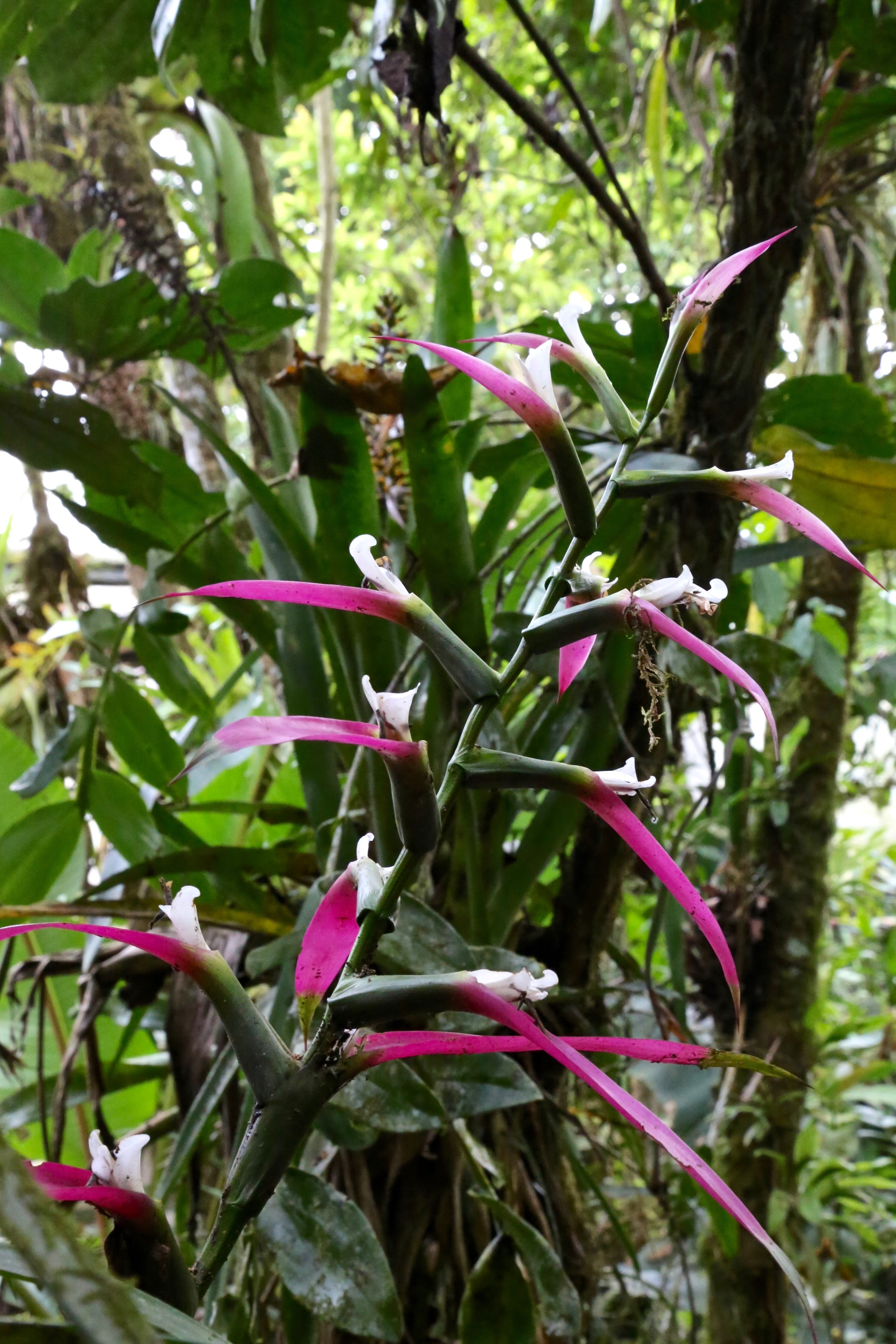
- Guzmania wittmackii, Ecuador, Mindo cloud forest

Scientific classification
- Kingdom: Plantae
- Clade: Tracheophytes
- Clade: Angiosperms
- Clade: Monocots
- Clade: Commelinids
- Order: Poales
- Family: Bromeliaceae
- Genus: Guzmania
- Species: G. wittmackii

Binomial name
- Guzmania wittmackii (André) André ex Mez

Synonyms
- Thecophyllum wittmackii André

= Guzmania wittmackii =

Species of plant

Guzmania wittmackii is a species of flowering plant in the Bromeliaceae family. It is native to Ecuador and Colombia, and widely cultivated elsewhere as an ornamental.

== Cultivars ==
- Guzmania 'Attila'
- Guzmania 'Cherry'
- Guzmania 'Cherry Smash'
- Guzmania 'Claret'
- Guzmania 'Daniel'
- Guzmania 'Decora'
- Guzmania 'Dolores'
- Guzmania 'Fiesta'
- Guzmania 'Grapeade'
- Guzmania 'Lila'
- Guzmania 'Magenta'
- Guzmania 'Mariposa'
- Guzmania 'Orangeade'
- Guzmania 'Ostara'
- Guzmania 'Pink Nova'
- Guzmania 'Rana'
- Guzmania 'Rood (Red)'
- Guzmania 'Sunset'
- Guzmania 'Tutti-Frutti'
- xGuzvriesea 'Aphrodite's Lips'
- xGuzvriesea 'Chilli Pepper'
- xGuzvriesea 'Garden Party'
- xGuzvriesea 'Happa'
- xGuzvriesea 'John Buchanan'
