= Guzmania dissitiflora =

Scientific classification
- Kingdom: Plantae
- Clade: Tracheophytes
- Clade: Angiosperms
- Clade: Monocots
- Clade: Commelinids
- Order: Poales
- Family: Bromeliaceae
- Genus: Guzmania
- Species: G. dissitiflora

Binomial name
- Guzmania dissitiflora (André) L.B.Sm.

Synonyms
- Sodiroa dissitiflora André

Species of plant

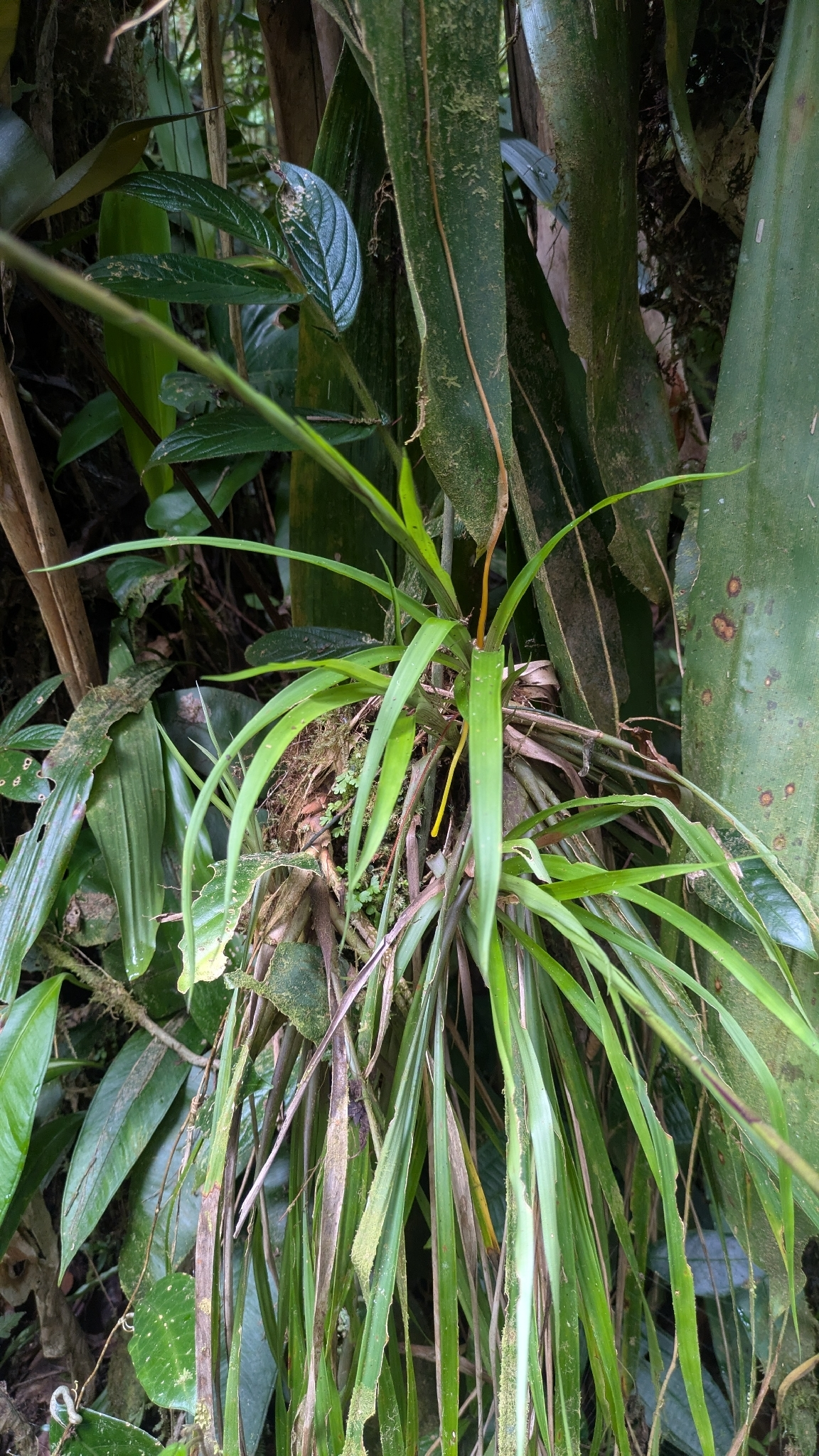
Guzmania dissitiflora in Colombia.

Guzmania dissitiflora is a species of flowering plant in the Bromeliaceae family. It is native to Ecuador, Colombia, Panama and Costa Rica.
