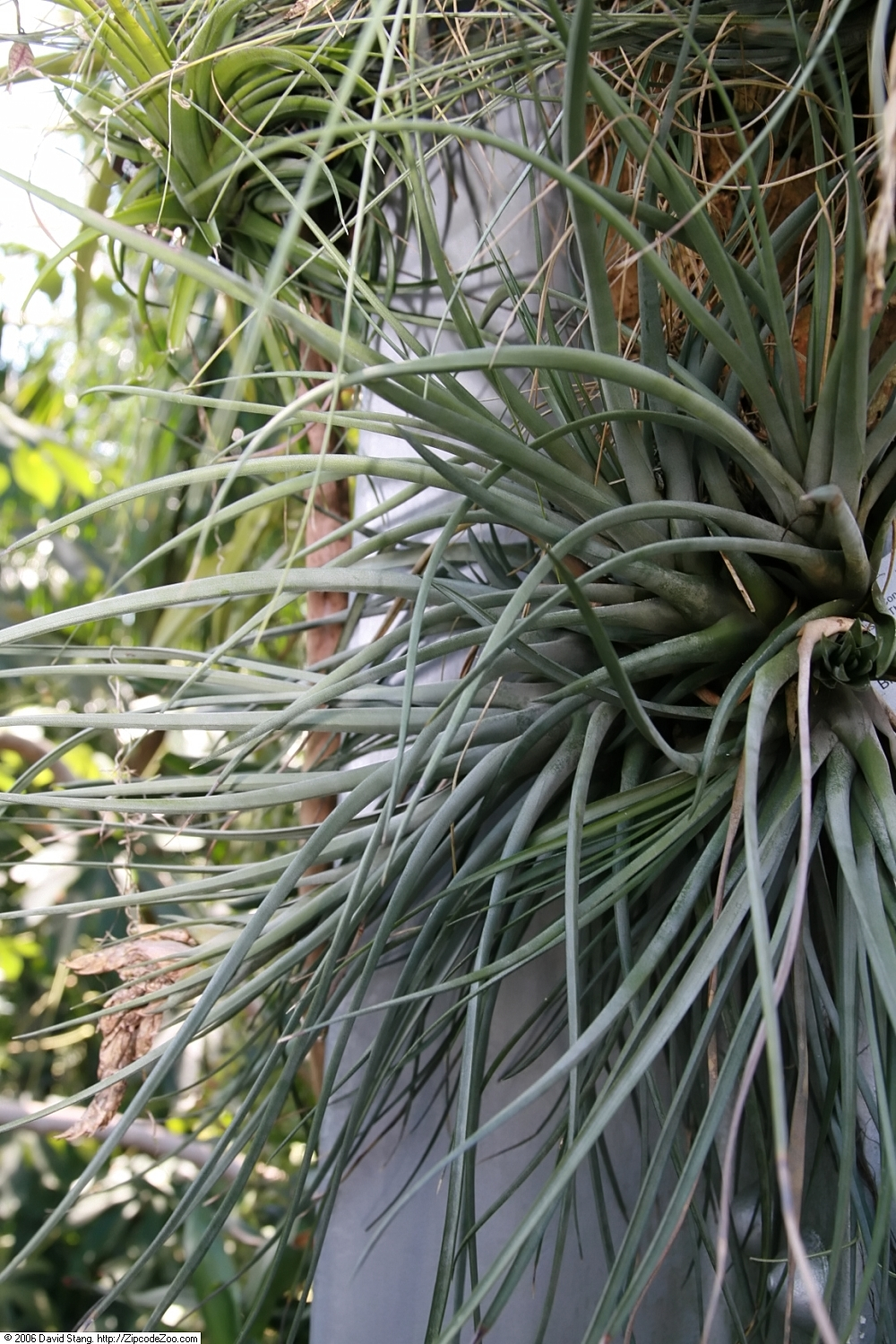

Conservation status
- Least Concern (IUCN 3.1)

Scientific classification
- Kingdom: Plantae
- Clade: Tracheophytes
- Clade: Angiosperms
- Clade: Monocots
- Clade: Commelinids
- Order: Poales
- Family: Bromeliaceae
- Genus: Tillandsia
- Subgenus: Tillandsia subg. Tillandsia
- Species: T. rhomboidea

Binomial name
- Tillandsia rhomboidea André

Synonyms
- Tillandsia acostae Mez & Tonduz

= Tillandsia rhomboidea =

Species of plant

Tillandsia rhomboidea is a species of flowering plant in the family Bromeliaceae, native to Bolivia, Colombia, Costa Rica, Ecuador, Honduras, southeastern Mexico and Venezuela. It was first described by André in 1888.
