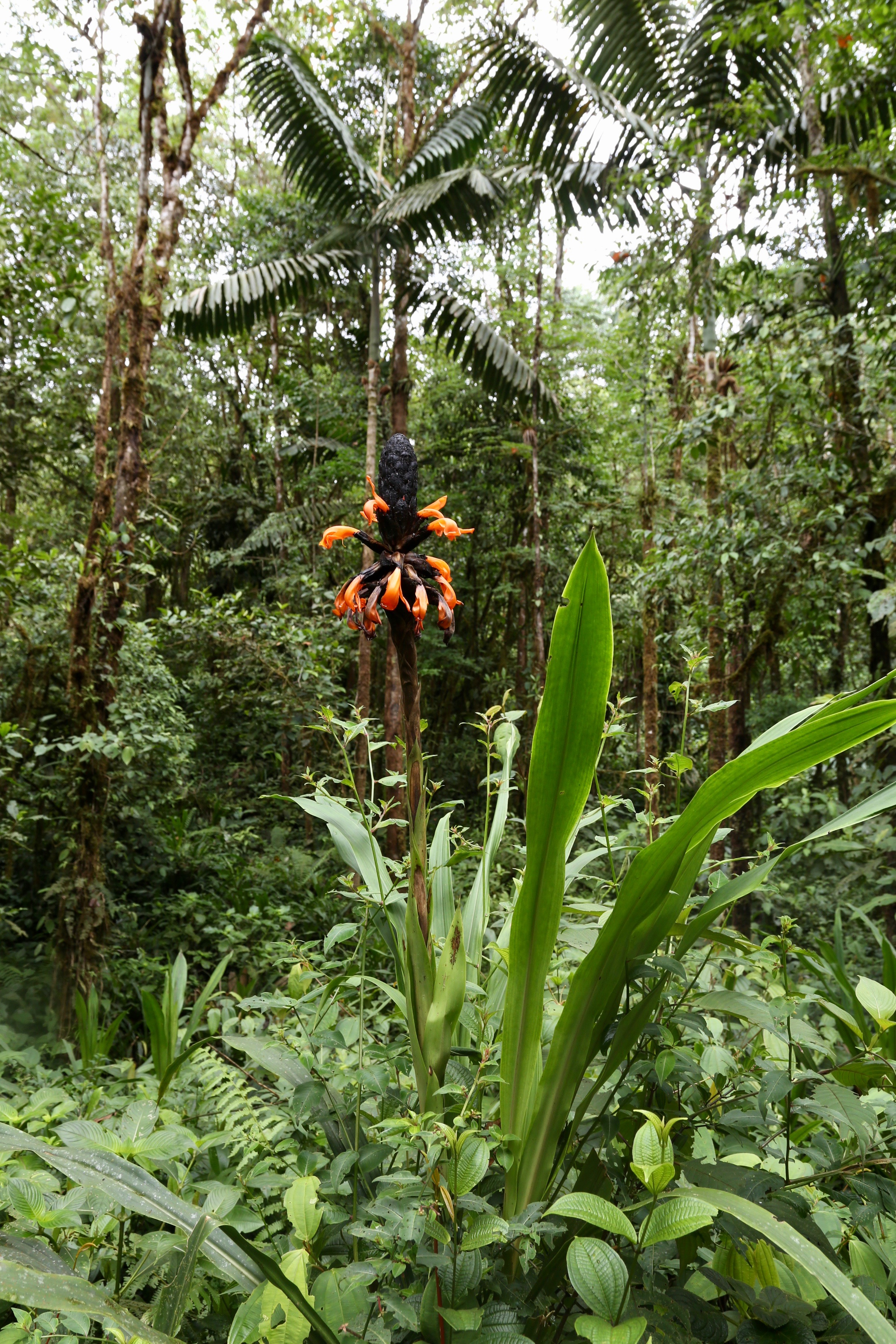

Scientific classification
- Kingdom: Plantae
- Clade: Tracheophytes
- Clade: Angiosperms
- Clade: Monocots
- Clade: Commelinids
- Order: Poales
- Family: Bromeliaceae
- Genus: Pitcairnia
- Species: P. bakeri

Binomial name
- Pitcairnia bakeri (André) Mez

Synonyms
- Quesnelia bakeri André; Hepetis bakeri (André) Mez

= Pitcairnia bakeri =

Species of plant

Pitcairnia bakeri is a species of flowering plant in the Bromeliaceae family. It is native to Ecuador and Colombia.
