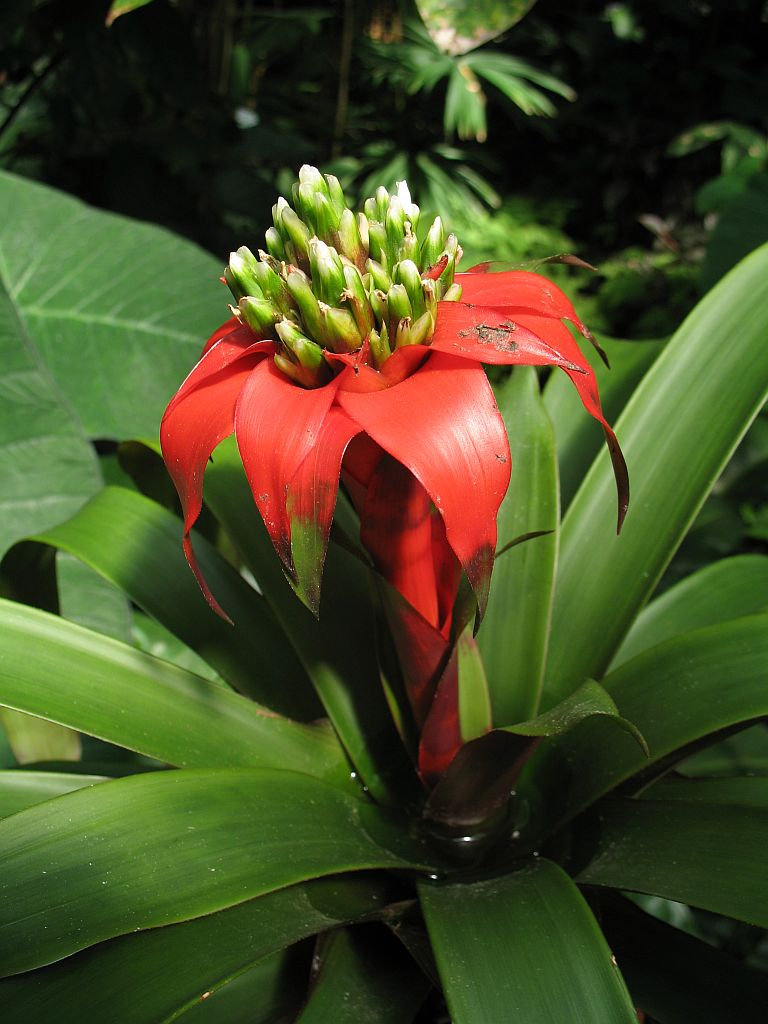

Scientific classification
- Kingdom: Plantae
- Clade: Embryophytes
- Clade: Tracheophytes
- Clade: Spermatophytes
- Clade: Angiosperms
- Clade: Monocots
- Clade: Commelinids
- Order: Poales
- Family: Bromeliaceae
- Genus: Guzmania
- Species: G. eduardi

Binomial name
- Guzmania eduardi André ex Mez

Synonyms
- Homotypic Synonyms: Caraguata morreniana André

= Guzmania eduardi =

Species of flowering plant

Guzmania eduardi is a species of flowering plant in the family Bromeliaceae. This species is native to Ecuador and Colombia.

== Cultivars ==
- Guzmania 'Spirit of '76'
