= Guzmania multiflora =

Scientific classification
- Kingdom: Plantae
- Clade: Tracheophytes
- Clade: Angiosperms
- Clade: Monocots
- Clade: Commelinids
- Order: Poales
- Family: Bromeliaceae
- Genus: Guzmania
- Species: G. multiflora

Binomial name
- Guzmania multiflora (André) André ex Mez

Synonyms
- Caraguata multiflora André

Species of plant

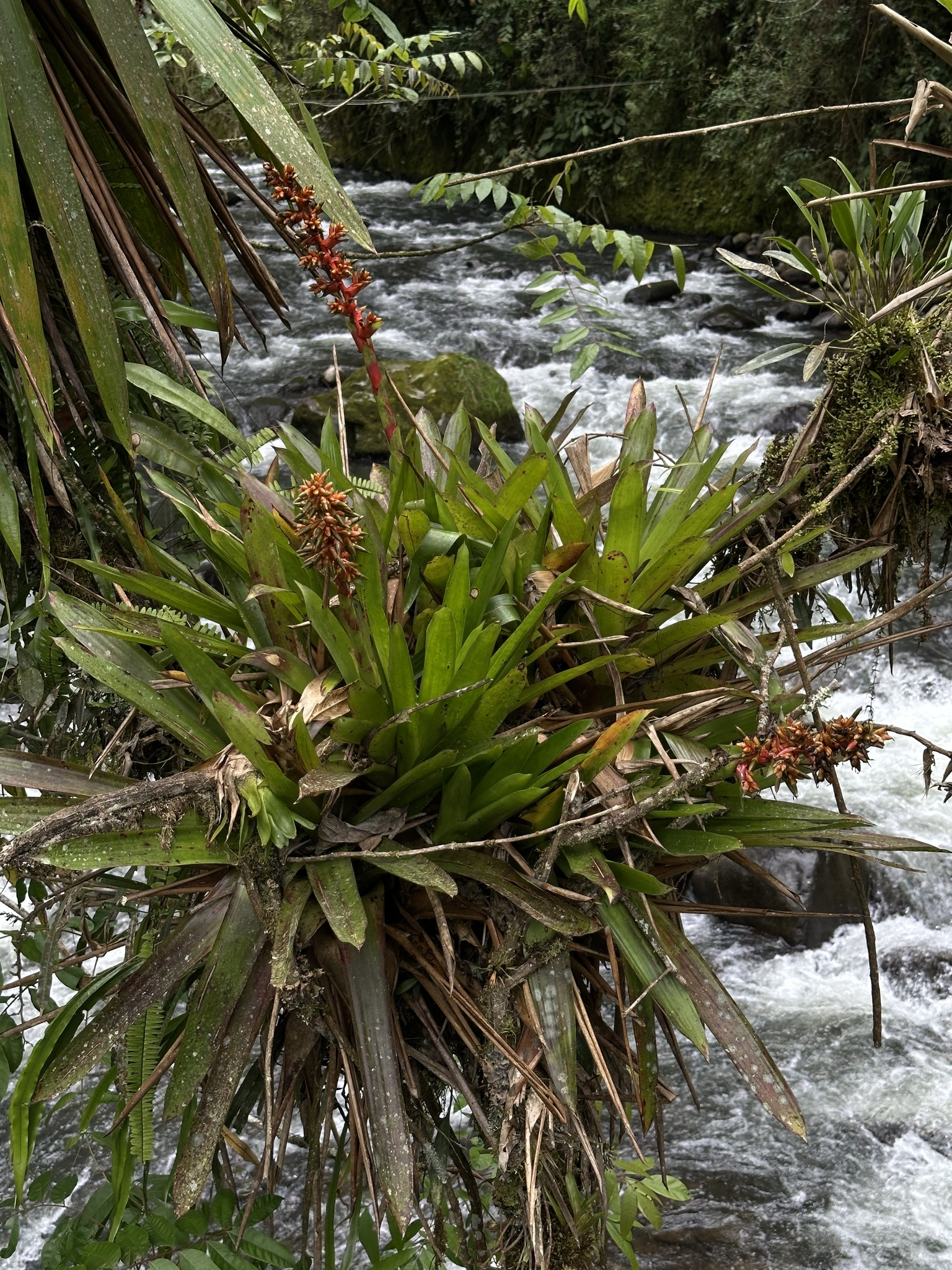
Guzmania multiflora

Guzmania multiflora is a species of flowering plant in the Bromeliaceae family. It is native to Ecuador and Colombia.
