= Pitcairnia macranthera =

Conservation status
- Least Concern (IUCN 3.1)

Scientific classification
- Kingdom: Plantae
- Clade: Tracheophytes
- Clade: Angiosperms
- Clade: Monocots
- Clade: Commelinids
- Order: Poales
- Family: Bromeliaceae
- Genus: Pitcairnia
- Species: P. macranthera

Binomial name
- Pitcairnia macranthera André

Synonyms
- Hepetis macranthera (André) Mez

Species of plant

Pitcairnia macranthera is a species of flowering plant in Bromeliaceae family. It is native to Ecuador.
