= Tillandsia heterandra =

Scientific classification
- Kingdom: Plantae
- Clade: Tracheophytes
- Clade: Angiosperms
- Clade: Monocots
- Clade: Commelinids
- Order: Poales
- Family: Bromeliaceae
- Genus: Tillandsia
- Subgenus: Tillandsia subg. Pseudovriesea
- Species: T. heterandra

Binomial name
- Tillandsia heterandra André

Synonyms
- Tillandsia lacera L.B.Sm. Vriesea lacera (L.B.Sm.) L.B.Sm.; Vriesea heterandra (André) L.B.Sm.

Species of flowering plant

Tillandsia heterandra, synonym Vriesea heterandra, is a species of flowering plant in the family Bromeliaceae, native to north-west South America (Bolivia, Colombia, Ecuador and Venezuela). It was first described by Édouard André in 1888.
