= Guzmania vanvolxemii =

Scientific classification
- Kingdom: Plantae
- Clade: Tracheophytes
- Clade: Angiosperms
- Clade: Monocots
- Clade: Commelinids
- Order: Poales
- Family: Bromeliaceae
- Genus: Guzmania
- Species: G. vanvolxemii

Binomial name
- Guzmania vanvolxemii (André) André ex Mez

Synonyms
- Guzmania van-volxemii (André) André ex Mez, alternate spelling; Caraguata van-volxemii André

Species of plant

Guzmania vanvolxemii is a species of flowering plant in the Bromeliaceae family. It is native to Ecuador and Colombia.
