= Guzmania bracteosa =

Scientific classification
- Kingdom: Plantae
- Clade: Tracheophytes
- Clade: Angiosperms
- Clade: Monocots
- Clade: Commelinids
- Order: Poales
- Family: Bromeliaceae
- Genus: Guzmania
- Species: G. bracteosa

Binomial name
- Guzmania bracteosa (André) André ex Mez

Synonyms
- Caraguata bracteosa André; Guzmania fusispica Mez & Sodiro

Species of plant

Guzmania bracteosa is a plant species of flowering plant in the Bromeliaceae family. It is endemic to Ecuador.
