= Tillandsia fragrans =

Scientific classification
- Kingdom: Plantae
- Clade: Tracheophytes
- Clade: Angiosperms
- Clade: Monocots
- Clade: Commelinids
- Order: Poales
- Family: Bromeliaceae
- Genus: Tillandsia
- Subgenus: Tillandsia subg. Pseudovriesea
- Species: T. fragrans

Binomial name
- Tillandsia fragrans André

Synonyms
- Vriesea fragrans (André) L.B.Sm.

Species of flowering plant

Tillandsia fragrans, synonym Vriesea fragrans, is a species of flowering plant in the family Bromeliaceae, native to north-west South America (Colombia, Ecuador, Venezuela). It was first described by Édouard André in 1888.
