= Guzmania graminifolia =

Scientific classification
- Kingdom: Plantae
- Clade: Embryophytes
- Clade: Tracheophytes
- Clade: Spermatophytes
- Clade: Angiosperms
- Clade: Monocots
- Clade: Commelinids
- Order: Poales
- Family: Bromeliaceae
- Genus: Guzmania
- Species: G. graminifolia

Binomial name
- Guzmania graminifolia (André ex Baker) L.B.Sm.

Synonyms
- Sodiroa graminifolia André ex Baker; Sodiroa trianae Mez

Species of plant

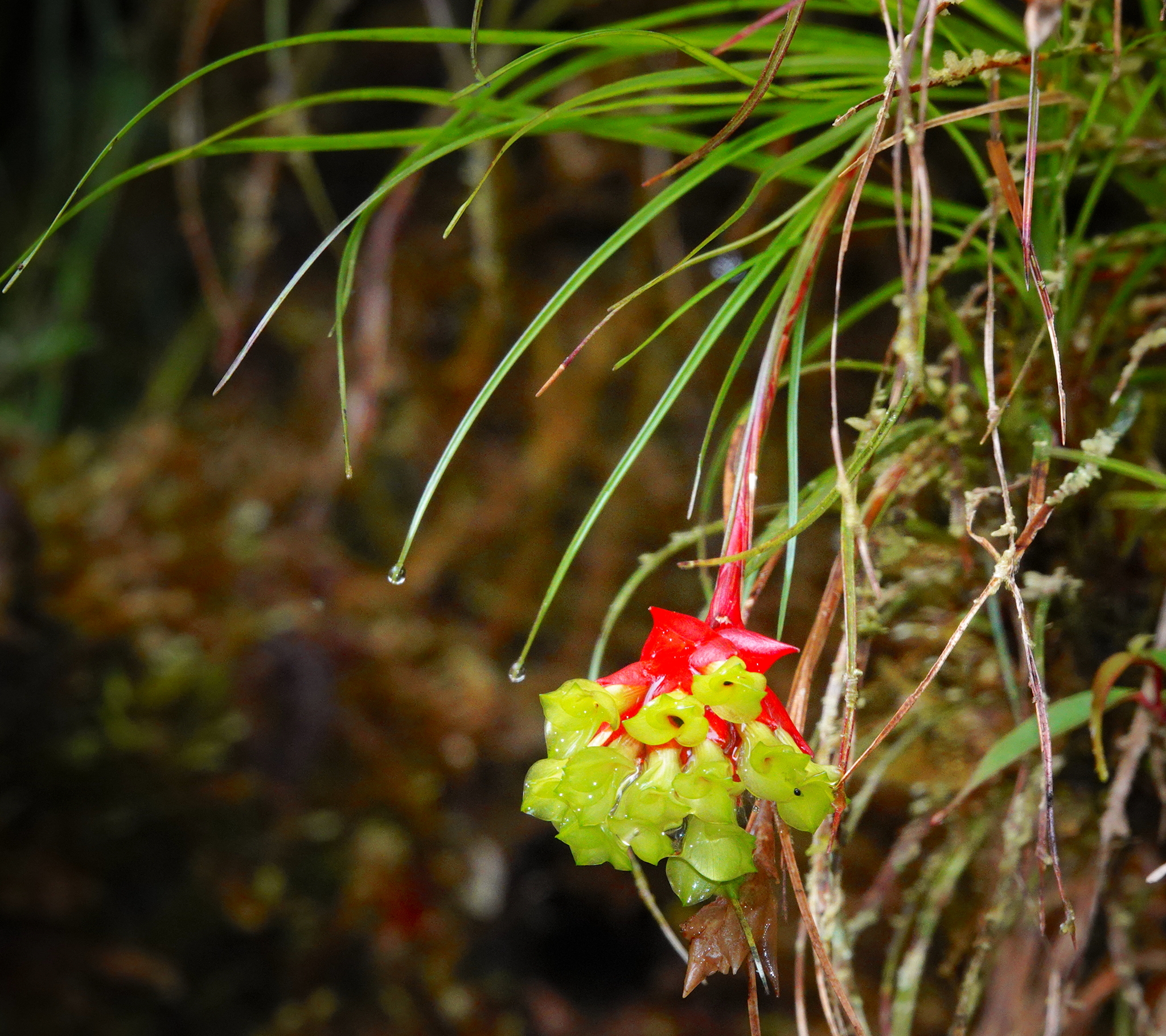
Guzmania graminifolia in Colombia.

Guzmania graminifolia is a species of flowering plant in the Bromeliaceae family. It is native to Ecuador, Peru, Colombia and Panama.
