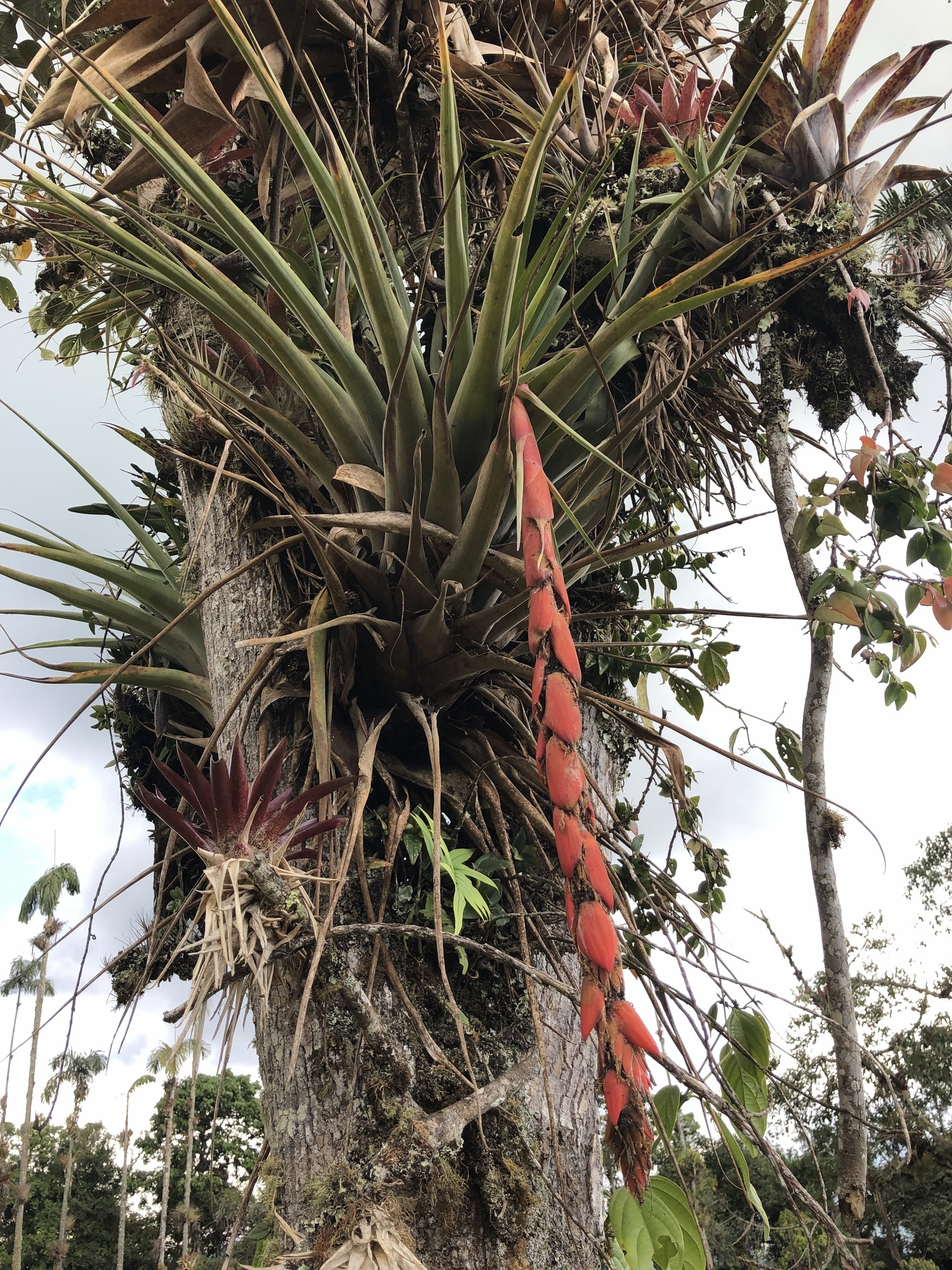

Scientific classification
- Kingdom: Plantae
- Clade: Tracheophytes
- Clade: Angiosperms
- Clade: Monocots
- Clade: Commelinids
- Order: Poales
- Family: Bromeliaceae
- Genus: Vriesea
- Species: V. tequendamae

Binomial name
- Vriesea tequendamae (André) L.B.Sm.

Synonyms
- Tillandsia tequendamae André; Tillandsia cygnea Mez & Sodiro

= Vriesea tequendamae =

Species of plant

Vriesea tequendamae is a species of flowering plant in the Bromeliaceae family. It is native to Venezuela, Colombia, Peru, and Ecuador.
