= Trakų Vokė Manor =

Former manor with Neo-Gothic architecture in Traku Voke

Coordinates: 54°37′50″N 25°06′31″E

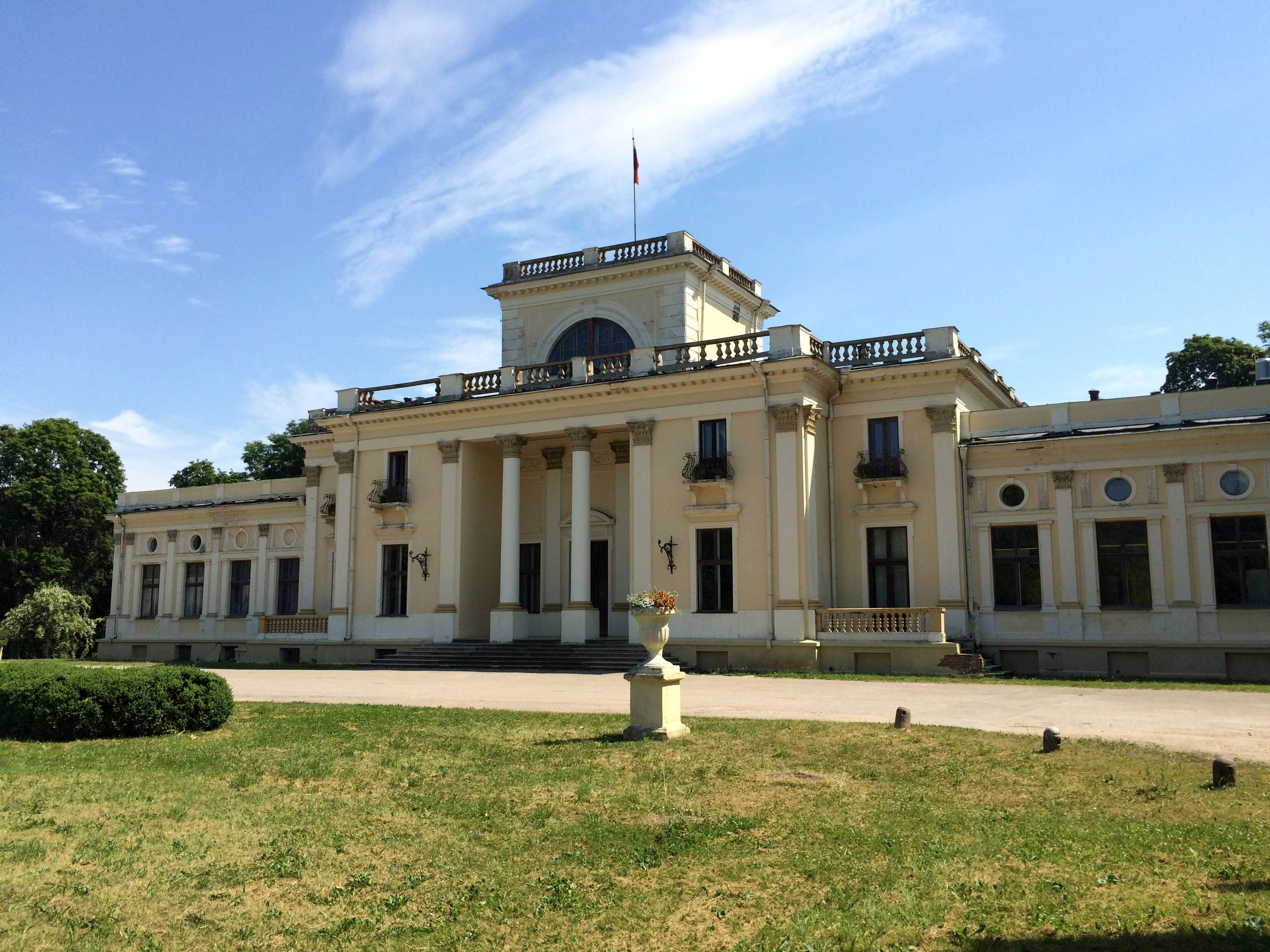

General information
- Architectural style: Historicist
- Location: Žalioji a. 2A, Vilnius 02232, Lithuania, Paneriai, Lithuania
- Construction started: 1876
- Completed: 1880

Design and construction
- Architect: Leandro Marconi

Website
- https://www.tvds.lt

Trakų Vokė Manor (Lithuanian: Trakų Vokės dvaras) is a historic manor complex in Trakų Vokė, a district of Vilnius, Lithuania. The estate belonged to the Tyszkiewicz family from the mid-19th century until the Second World War. Its principal building, a Neoclassical palace with Neo-Renaissance elements, was constructed between 1876 and 1880 for Count Jan Witold Tyszkiewicz to a design by the Polish-Italian architect Leandro Marconi, inspired by the Palace on the Isle in Warsaw.

The manor complex includes a Neo-Gothic chapel, stables, service buildings and an extensive landscaped park, redesigned between 1898 and 1900 by the French landscape architect Édouard André. Following nationalization after the Second World War, the palace housed Soviet agricultural research institutions. Restored in the 1970s and subsequently renovated, it is now a protected cultural heritage site used for cultural events, exhibitions and educational activities.

== History ==
The name Vokė was first mentioned in 1375, when a battle between the Lithuanians and the Teutonic Order took place in the area. In 1396 Grand Duke Vytautas the Great (c1350–1430) settled Tartars in the area. In 1415 the Vokė village became property of a Benedictine Monastery. Trakų Vokė estate can first be found in historical sources in the 16th century.

In the middle of the 19th century, in the present territory of Trakų Vokė Manor, there was a manor owned by Nobleman Trakai Marshal Ludwig Dombrovski.

=== The Tyszkiewicz family ===
The Tyszkiewicz family (probably Józef Tyszkiewicz (1805–1844)) bought the estate from Dombrovski in the mid-19th century. Józef Tyszkiewicz was from the second branch of the Biržai family of Lithuanian nobles.

In 1850, the property with an area of 4735 land tithes included a farm and nine villages.

==== Jan Witold Tyszkiewicz (1831–1892) ====
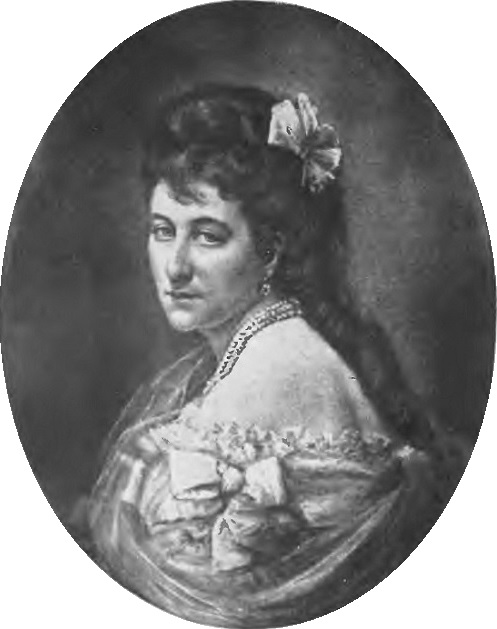
Jan Witold Tyszkiewicz's wife Iza Tyszkiewicz - Carolus-Duran

The estate was then handed down to Józef’s son, Jan Witold Tyszkiewicz (1831–1892). Jan was Marshal of Nobility for Vilnius and Ashmyany County.

Initially, Jan Witold visited only in the summers but after the uprising of 1863, he moved from Valozhyn (in modern-day Belarus), which was far from Vilnius, to Trakų Vokė, which at that time was a leased farm. He grew to like the area and decided to build a home. Between 1876 and 1880 Jan built the manor house that stands today. The architect was the Italian Leandro Marconi. Marconi was inspired by the architecture of the Polish royalty’s residence of Palace on the Isle in Warsaw, creating a similar neoclassical manor house at Trakų Vokė.

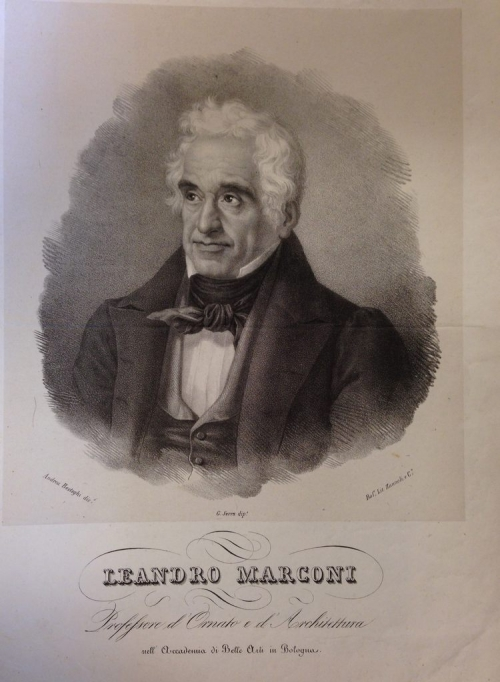
Leandro Marconi

The buildings included the manor house, a kitchen and laundry building, a steward’s house, the farm labourers’ quarters, a granary, a signal tower, a stable barn and a chapel - all grouped around a spacious yard, and once surrounded by a stone wall (fragments which survive to this day) with gates on three sides. This lay-out manifests an important feature of Historicist architecture, i.e., an attempt to move away from the ceremonial aspect of previous epochs and to return to the traditional and practical structure of a peasant farm. Distinctive Neoclassical, Neo-Gothic and eclectic elements, as well as traditions of ethnic building, are visible in the wooden houses.

In 1885 the estate consisted of 4,735 tenths of land.

From 1880 Jan Witold’s health began to decline and he began to spend a lot of time abroad consulting with Viennese doctors.

In 1892, Jan Witold died and was buried in the family grave in the basement of the chapel he had built himself.

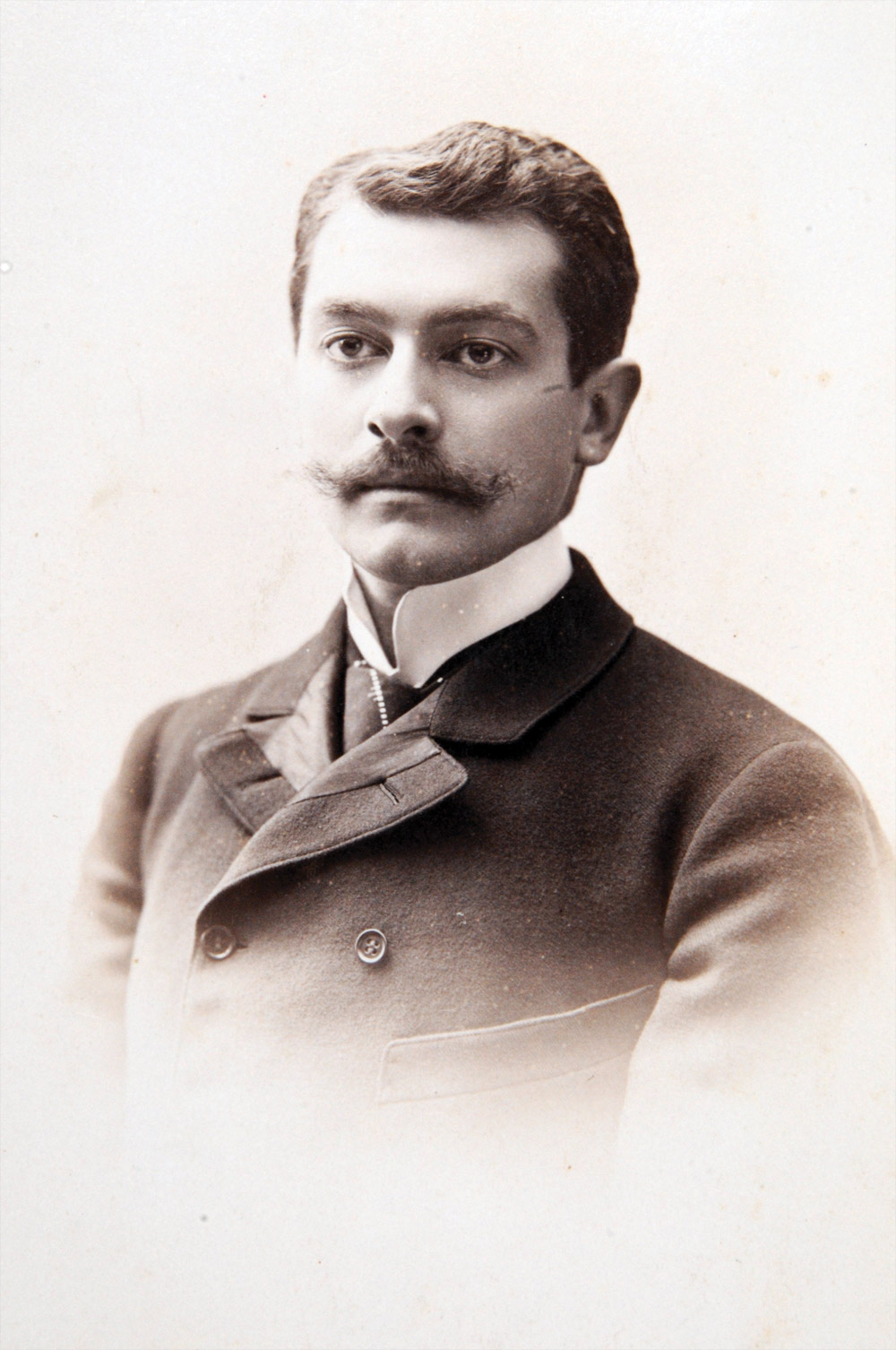
Jan Józef Tyszkiewicz c. 1890

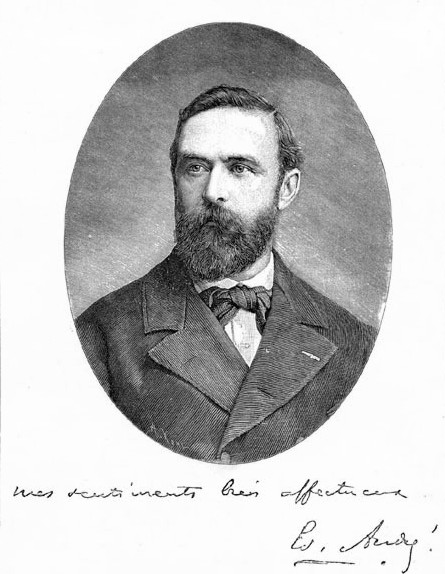
Édouard André c. 1880

==== Jan Józef Tyszkiewicz (1867–1903) ====
Jan Józef Tyszkiewicz inherited Trakų Vokė.

Jan Józef was an intellectual, so his mother had to oversee the business of the estate. As one story goes: a butler (also named Jan) ran up to Jan Józef to inform him that there was a thief in the library. Jan Józef replied: "Interesting, and what is he reading?" Jan Józef collected foreign periodicals and meticulously supplemented the palace's library collections.

Jan Józef invited the famous landscape architect Édouard André to the manor in order to redesign the park. From André's notes, we know that together with his son Rene (also a professional landscape architect), he visited Trakų Vokė for the first time in 1898. Work on the park and garden were completed in 1900.

Even with a beautiful new garden and manor house, however, the Tyszkiewiczes were rare guests at Trakų Vokė as Jan Józef’s wife, Elżbieta Maria, suffered from tuberculosis and spent most of her time in warmer climes for relief. However, ironically it would be Jan Józef who would die first.

In 1903, on a trip to Davos Switzerland, which the family took for the health benefits mountain air would give his wife, Jan Józef died unexpectedly of appendicitis in front of his family at the age of thirty-five.

==== Jan Michał Tyszkiewicz (1896–1939) ====
After Jan Józef's death, the manor was inherited by his eldest son, Jan Michał Tyszkiewicz (1896–1939).

Jan Michał, however, was only seven years old at the time of his father’s death and his three siblings were even younger. The young family spent most of the next few years in Davos.

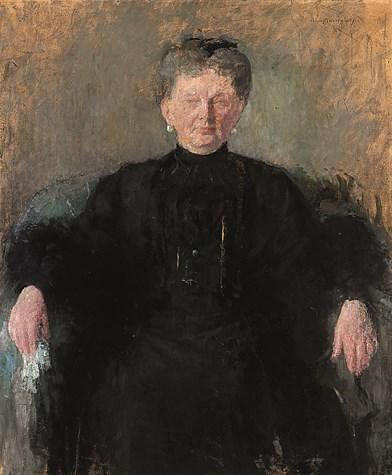
Countess Róża née Potocki

Jan Michał’s mother, Elżbieta Maria, died two years later, in 1905. On her deathbed, she dictated her last will to her mother, Countess Róża née Potocki (1849–1937). She not only ordered her children to "obey their superiors" in their childhood, but also to respect their homeland, foster family harmony and walk through life honestly and without hypocrisy. She appointed her mother, as the caretaker of four orphans. Róża brought them back to Trakų Vokė.

Jan Michał took part in the Polish-Soviet War of 1918–1920.

The estates were ruined after the war, without farm facilities, agricultural machinery and tools. Jan Michał was forced to take out bank loans, which he worked hard to repay for years. The preserved letters show how rarely he visited his beloved Trakų Vokė, and how he went out of his way to help his brothers.

==== The Interwar Period ====
In the interwar period, Trakų Vokė was a part of Poland. Like the neighbouring estates, the manor house didn’t have central heating, and until 1939, not all the rooms were renovated. Money instead was allocated for the land, farm, the water supply and a bathhouse for workers, as the disastrous state of hygiene at that time caused numerous and rapidly spreading diseases. In order to cope with all this, in addition to agriculture, Jan Michał took over industry; taking over and developing a paper factory in Waka Murowana and building a cardboard factory in Pabradė. Today, few people remember that the town received water, power and lighting thanks to the initiative and financing of Jan Michał, who built up a local stream in Pabradė and almost went bankrupt because of it.

In the years 1930–1935 Jan Michał was a member of the Sejm of the Second Polish Republic of the 3rd term of office, a member of the Union of Landowners, a counsellor of the Chamber of Commerce and Industry in Vilnius, a member of the parish board of Catholic Action in Lentvaris and the Vilnius Charity Society, as well as many other social, economic and philanthropic organizations. He also financially supported these organizations.

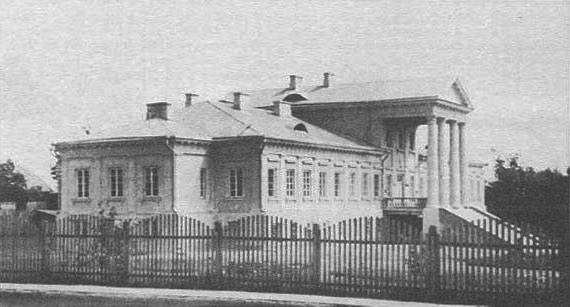
Tyszkiewicz Palace in Valozhyn (1919–1939)

The conservative Vilnius newspaper Słowo also owed its birth to him.

Before 1939, Jan Michał owned the following properties: Trakų Vokė, Valozhyn (in modern-day Belarus) and Surchów (in modern-day Poland). He inherited the last ones under the will of Polish philosopher, economist and social and political activist August Cieszkowski (1814–1894), a friend of the family and a great admirer of Grandma Róża. Therefore, according to the wishes of the deceased donor, Jan Michał was called Cieszkowski-Tyszkiewicz.

Jan lived in Trakų Vokė with his wife Anna Maria Janina Tyszkiewicz (née Radziwiłł) (1907–1983) daughter of Jonas Karol Radziwiłł (brother of Prince Constantin Radziwiłł - owner of Taujėnai Manor) and Izabelė Vodzicka. In 1939, returning from a birthday celebration thrown in his honour in Podlasie, Jan Michał died in an aircraft accident.

Anna and her three younger children (Anna, Ežbieta and Zygmunt) stayed for a few months at Trakų Vokė but then, in fear of the Russian occupying army, retreated to the West.

=== World War II and the Soviet Period ===
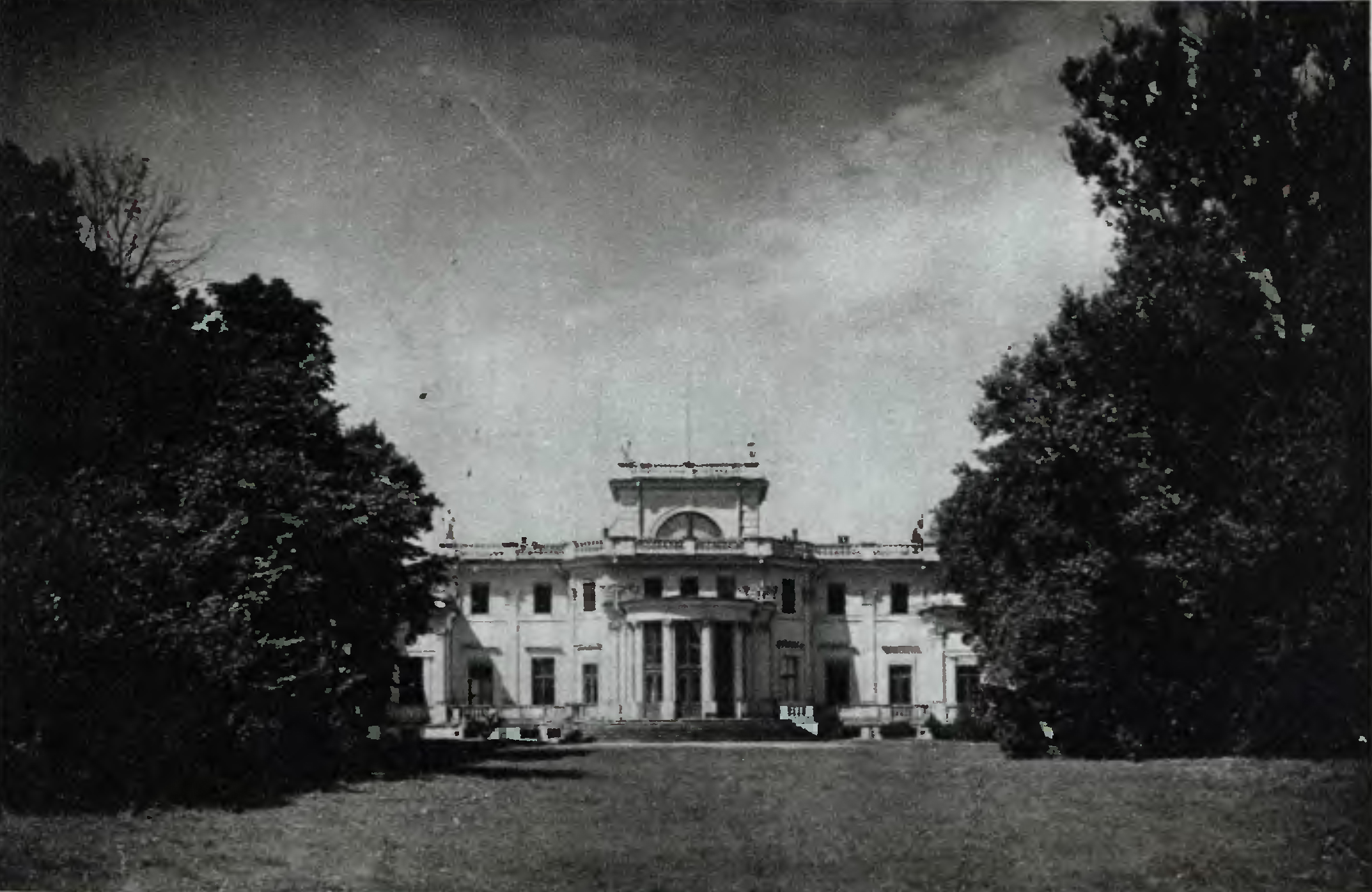
Trakų Vokė 1930

During World War II colonists from the Netherlands lived in the manor. The paintings, furniture, crystal chandeliers and other valuable items were stolen, and the exterior was damaged.

In 1945 the manor became the headquarters of the Council of Ministers of the LSSR and later the Vokė branch of the Dotnuva Institute of Agriculture. In 1952 the manor housed the Institute of Agriculture and Soil of the Lithuanian Academy of Sciences.

During the Soviet era, the palace was restored, partitioned with new wooden partitions, a new heating system was introduced, paintings, tapestries, carpets, furniture, as well as sculptures adorning the building were lost. For several years, the palace was left to its fate, but restored after the war (architect A. Lagunavičius). In 1970 some elements of the palace interior were restored by architect J. Zibolis. The manor house was renovated in 1971–1978.

=== The Present Period ===
In 2002, The Royal Union of Lithuanian Nobility received a lease for the Trakų Vokė Manor from the Government of the Republic of Lithuania for 99 years. In 2004 the historical cultural centre of the public institution Dvarai Culture Center was established. Since 2014 the manor has been managed by Public Institution ‘Trakų Vokės dvaro sodyba’.

The Manor is now open to guests all year round with concerts, performances, exhibitions, guided tours, and cultural and private events. Films such as War and Peace, Anna Karenina, ‘Pop against Hitler’, and the serial ‘Price of Freedom. Volunteers’ among others were filmed at Trakų Vokė.

== Gallery ==
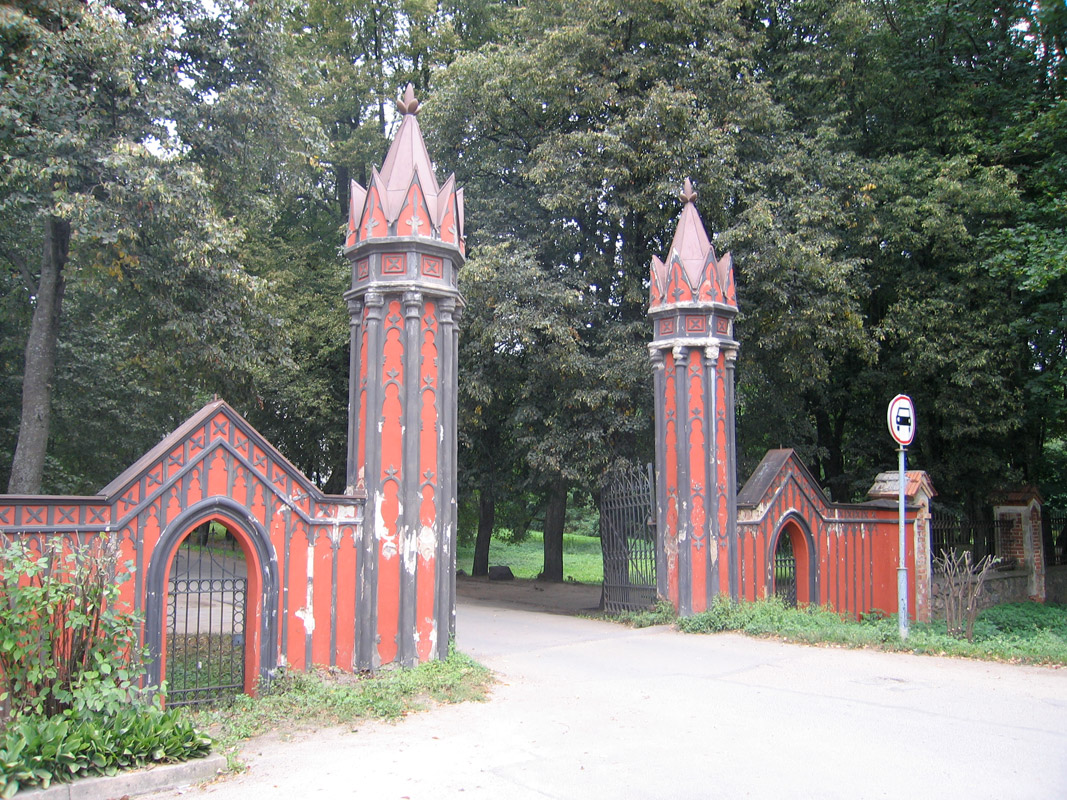
Gates to the manor territory

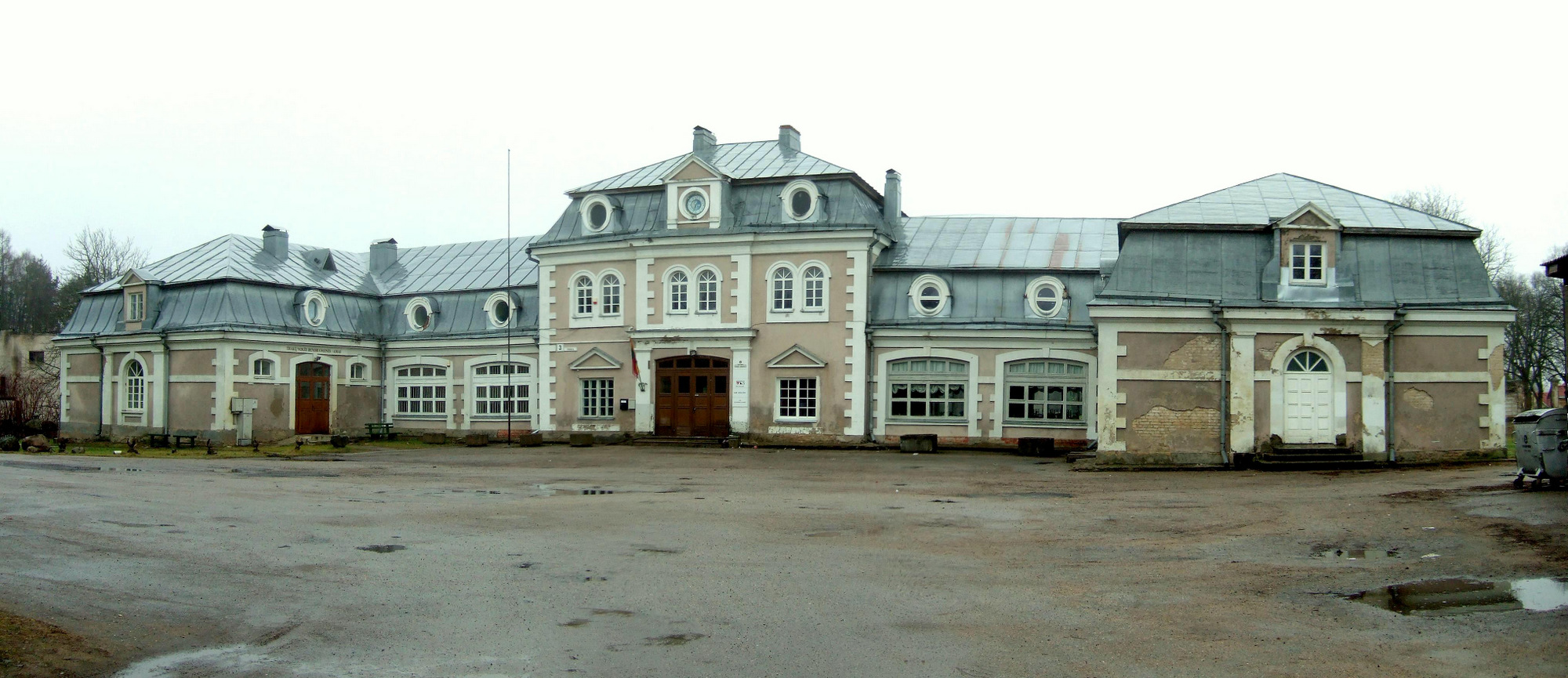
Stables of the manor

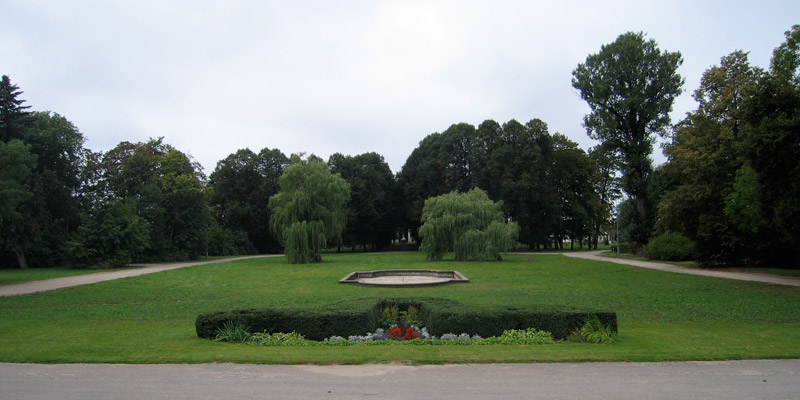
Fragment of the manor park

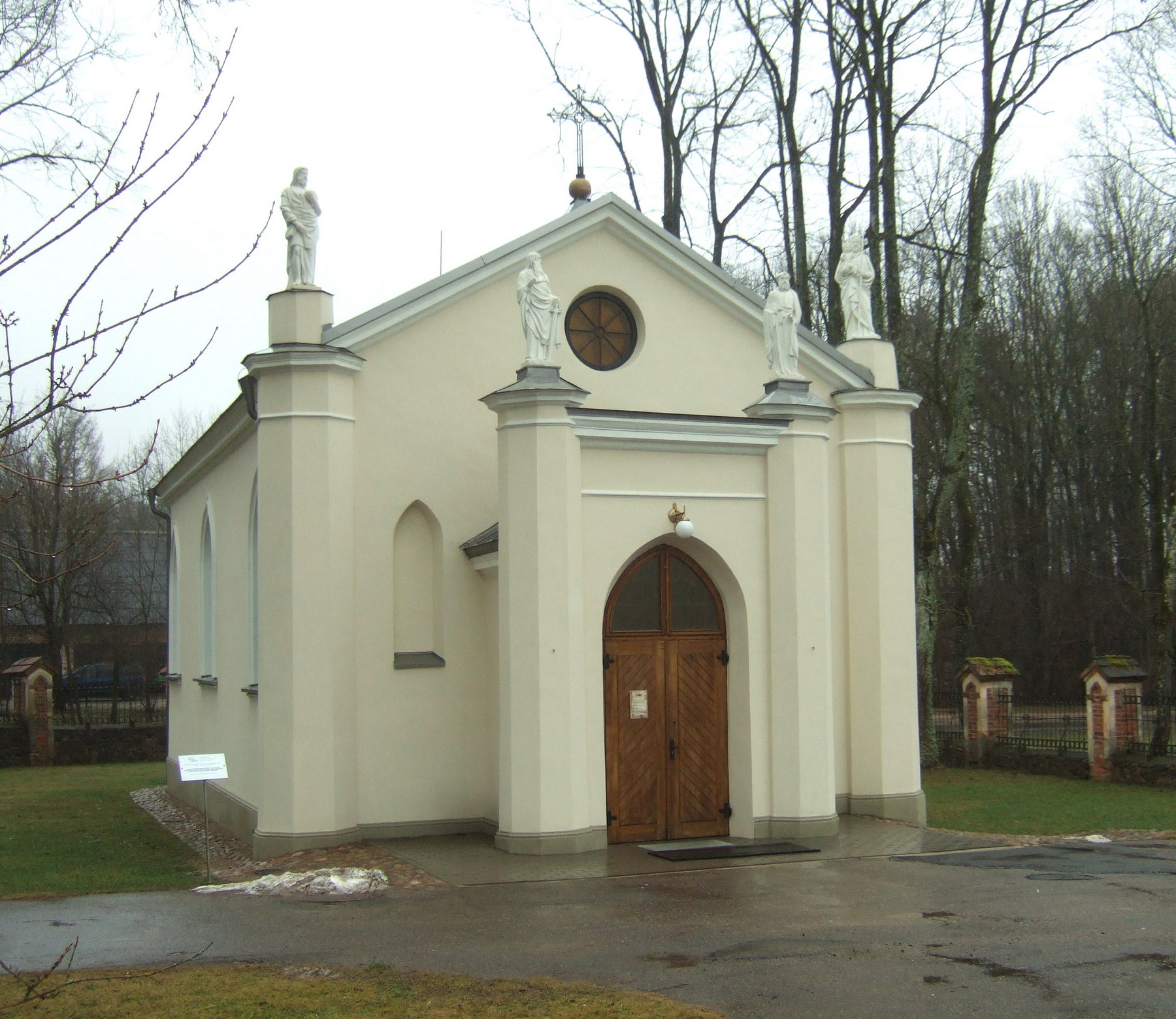
Chapel and mausoleum

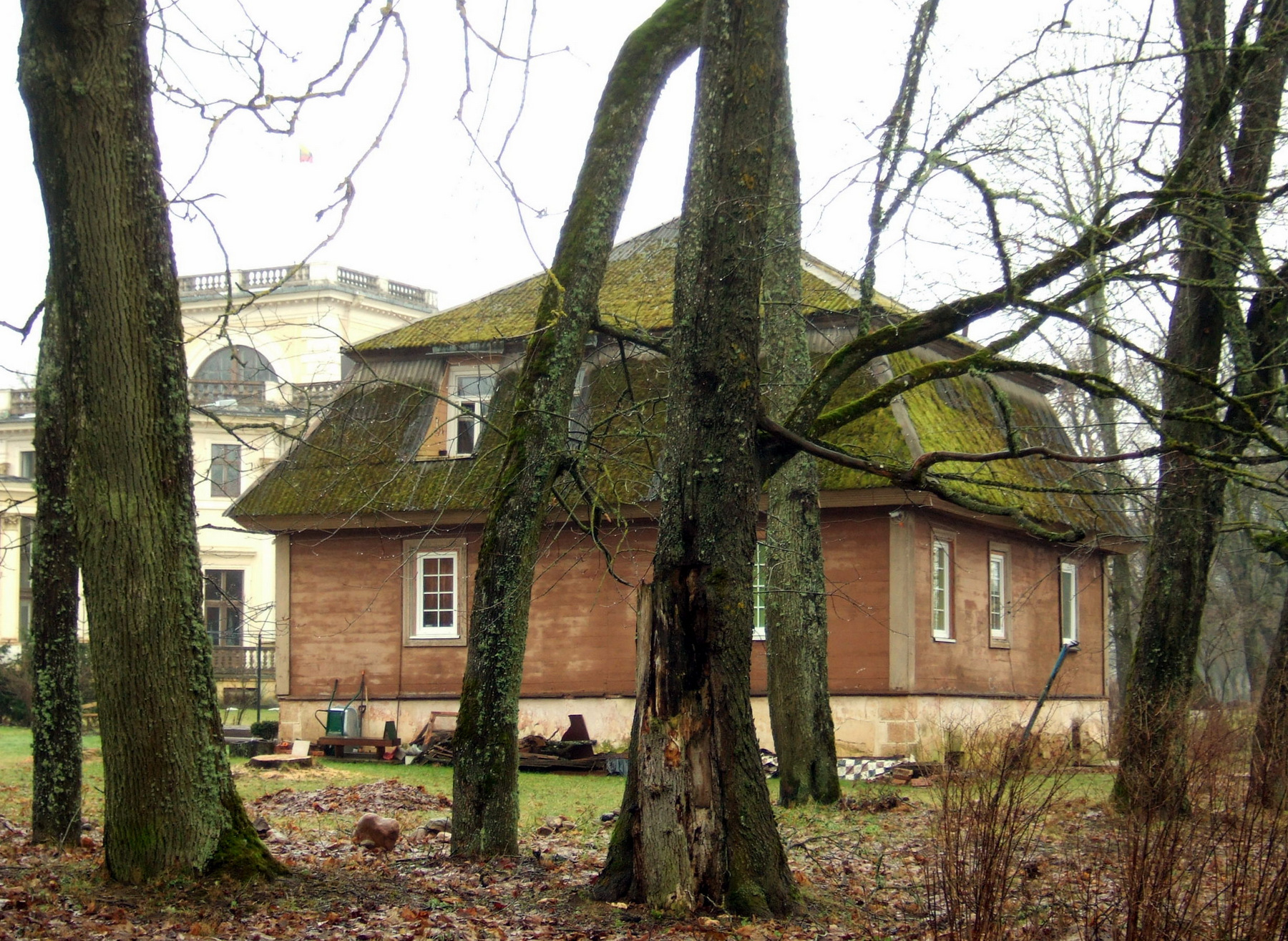
Oficina

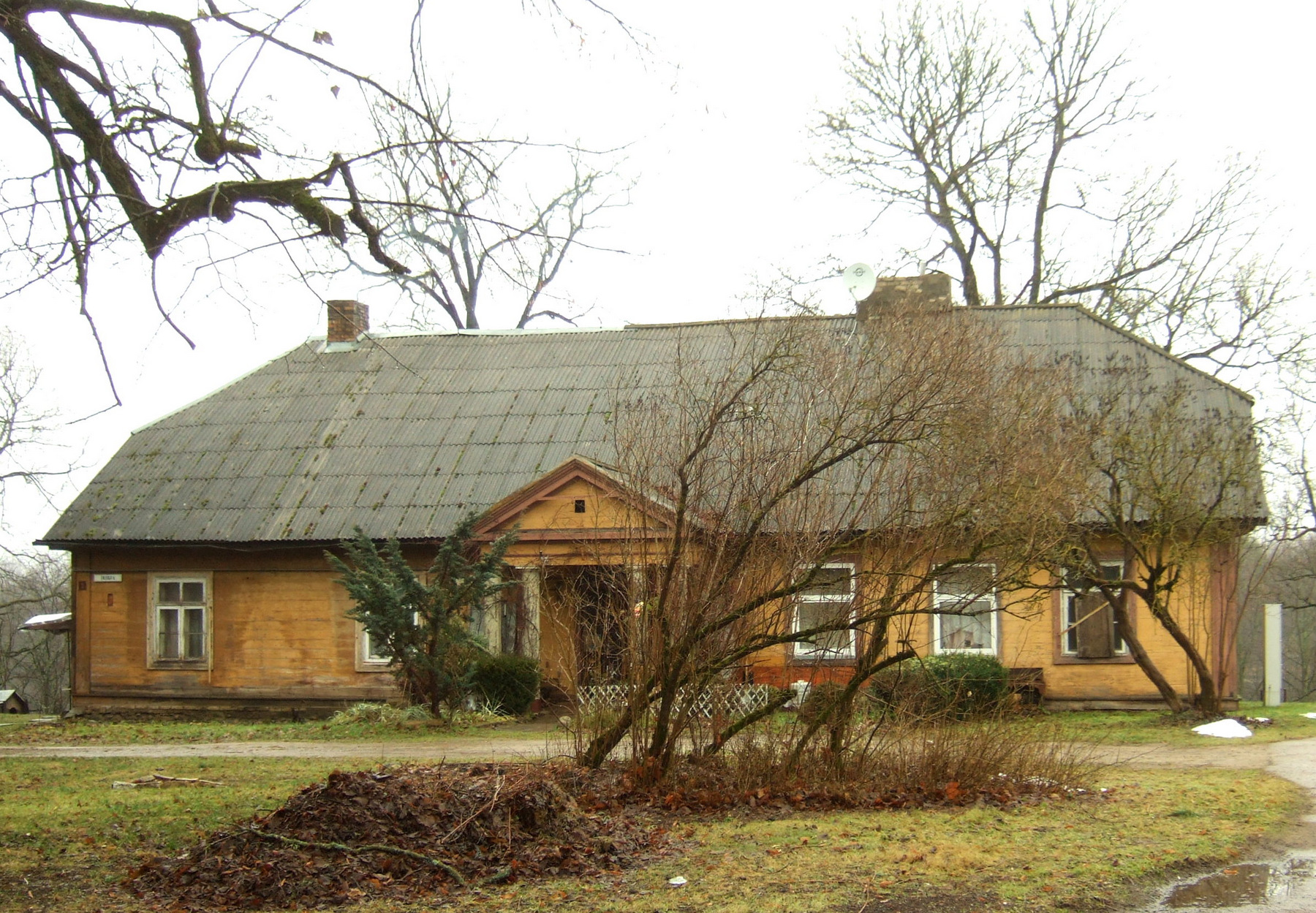
Housekeeper house

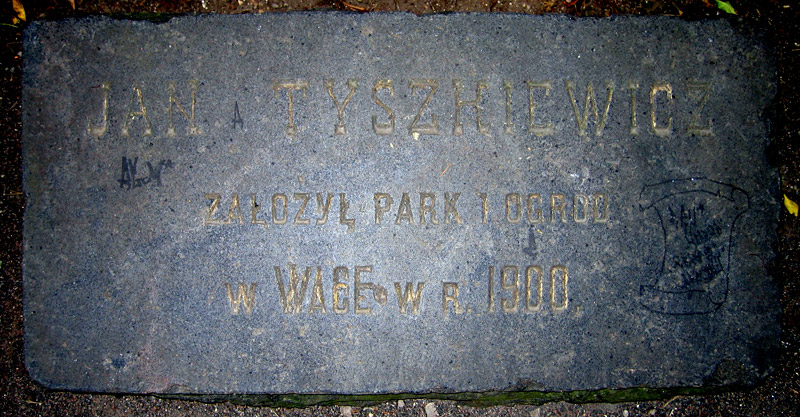
Commemorative plaque

== Significant depictions in popular culture ==
- The manor appeared in the HBO's miniseries Catherine the Great and served as the residence of Catherine the Great (acted by Helen Mirren).
