= Tillandsia didistichoides =

Scientific classification
- Kingdom: Plantae
- Clade: Tracheophytes
- Clade: Angiosperms
- Clade: Monocots
- Clade: Commelinids
- Order: Poales
- Family: Bromeliaceae
- Genus: Tillandsia
- Subgenus: Tillandsia subg. Pseudovriesea
- Species: T. didistichoides

Binomial name
- Tillandsia didistichoides Mez

Synonyms
- Vriesea didistichoides (Mez) L.B.Sm.

Species of flowering plant

Tillandsia didistichoides, synonym Vriesea didistichoides, is a species of flowering plant in the family Bromeliaceae, native to the Caribbean, south-east Mexico to Honduras, Colombia and Venezuela. It was first described by Carl Christian Mez in 1896.
