= Tillandsia chontalensis =

Scientific classification
- Kingdom: Plantae
- Clade: Tracheophytes
- Clade: Angiosperms
- Clade: Monocots
- Clade: Commelinids
- Order: Poales
- Family: Bromeliaceae
- Genus: Tillandsia
- Subgenus: Tillandsia subg. Pseudovriesea
- Species: T. chontalensis

Binomial name
- Tillandsia chontalensis Baker

Synonyms
- Tillandsia spuria Mez & Wercklé; Vriesea chontalensis (Baker) L.B.Sm.

Species of flowering plant

Tillandsia chontalensis, synonym Vriesea chontalensis, is a species of flowering plant in the family Bromeliaceae, native from Central America (Costa Rica, Honduras, Nicaragua, Panama) to Colombia, north west Ecuador and west Bolivia. It was first described by John Gilbert Baker in 1887.
