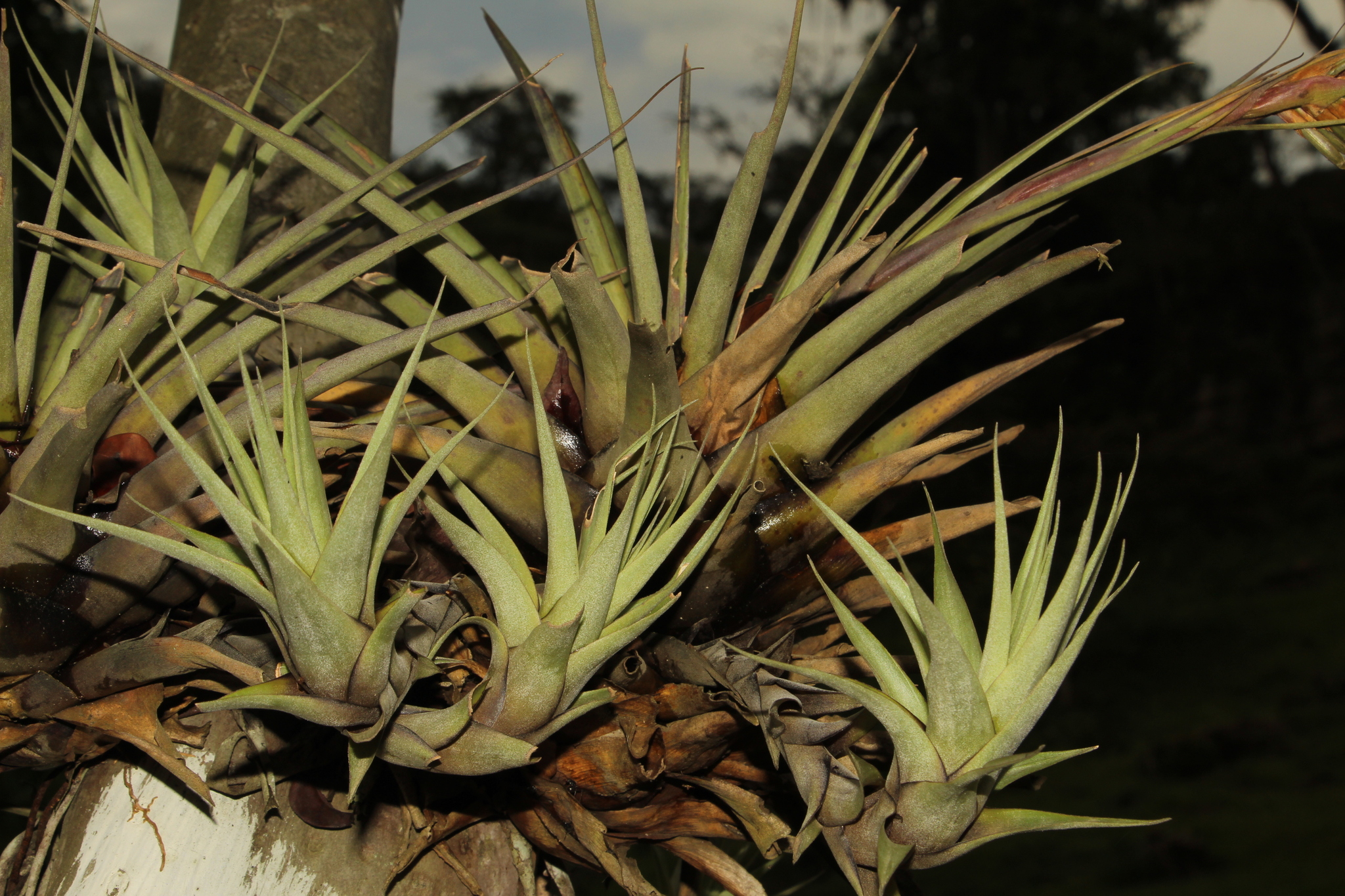

Scientific classification
- Kingdom: Plantae
- Clade: Tracheophytes
- Clade: Angiosperms
- Clade: Monocots
- Clade: Commelinids
- Order: Poales
- Family: Bromeliaceae
- Genus: Tillandsia
- Subgenus: Tillandsia subg. Pseudovriesea
- Species: T. myriantha

Binomial name
- Tillandsia myriantha Baker

Synonyms
- Vriesea myriantha (Baker) Betancur

= Tillandsia myriantha =

Species of plant

Tillandsia myriantha is a species of flowering plant in the genus Tillandsia. This species is native to Colombia and Venezuela.
