= Vriesea incurva =

Scientific classification
- Kingdom: Plantae
- Clade: Tracheophytes
- Clade: Angiosperms
- Clade: Monocots
- Clade: Commelinids
- Order: Poales
- Family: Bromeliaceae
- Genus: Vriesea
- Species: V. incurva

Binomial name
- Vriesea incurva (Griseb.) Read

Synonyms
- Tillandsia incurva Griseb.; Tillandsia dactylifera E.Morren ex Baker; Tillandsia digitata Mez

Species of epiphyte

Vriesea incurva is a plant species of flowering plant in the family Bromeliaceae. This species is an epiphyte native to Central America (Costa Rica and Panama), the Greater Antilles (Cuba, Jamaica, Hispaniola), and South America (Colombia, Guyana, Bolivia, Venezuela and Ecuador).
