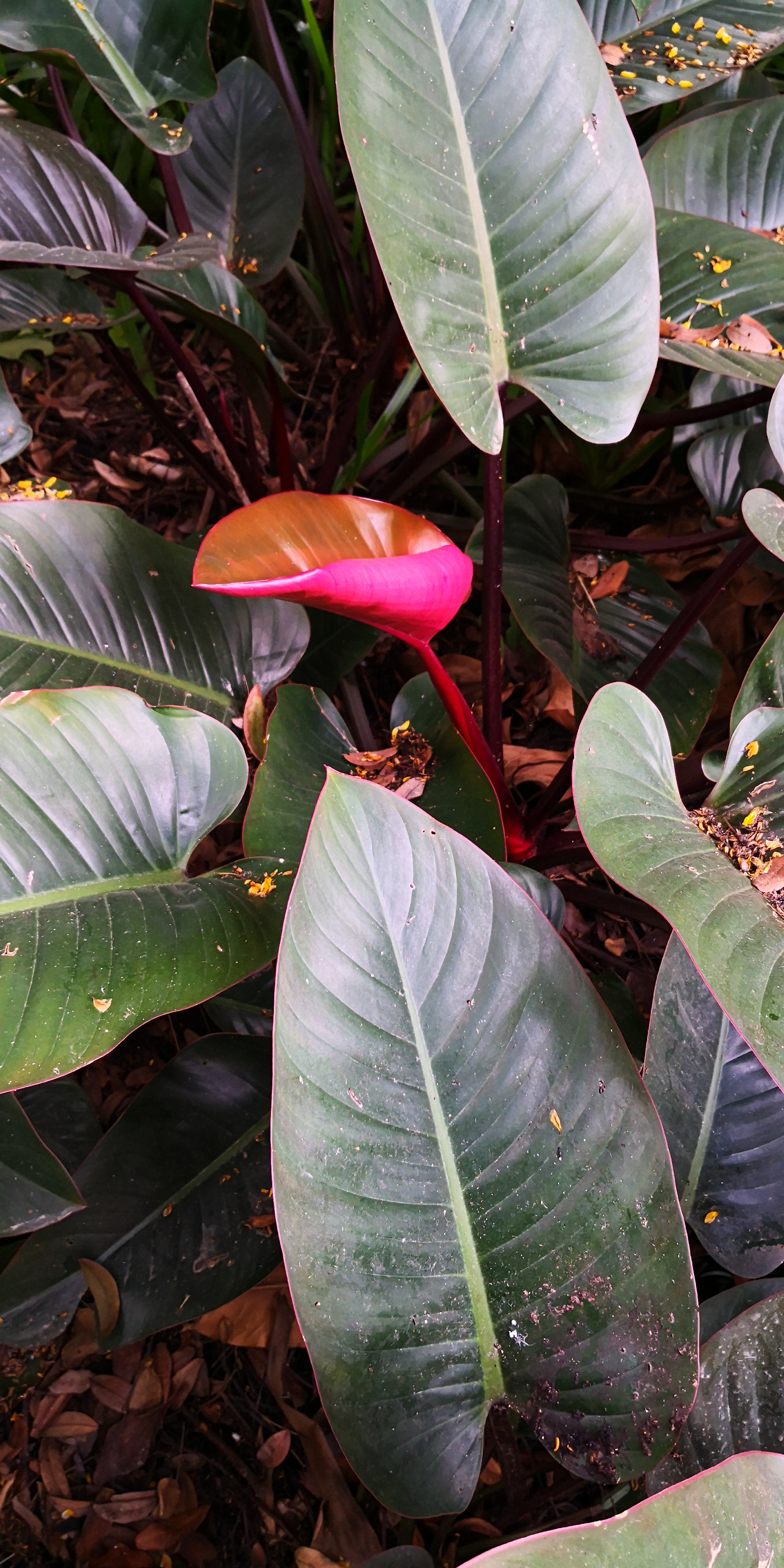

Scientific classification
- Kingdom: Plantae
- Clade: Tracheophytes
- Clade: Angiosperms
- Clade: Monocots
- Order: Alismatales
- Family: Araceae
- Genus: Philodendron
- Species: P. erubescens

Binomial name
- Philodendron erubescens K.Koch & Augustin

= Philodendron erubescens =

Species of vine

Philodendron erubescens, the blushing philodendron or red-leaf philodendron, is a species of flowering plant in the family Araceae, native to Colombia. It is a robust evergreen climber growing to 3–6 m (10–20 ft), with red stems and heart-shaped leaves up to 40 cm (16 in) in length. The flowers are deep red, fragrant spathes up to 15 cm (6 in) long, in summer and autumn. The specific epithet erubescens means "blushing".

== Horticulture ==
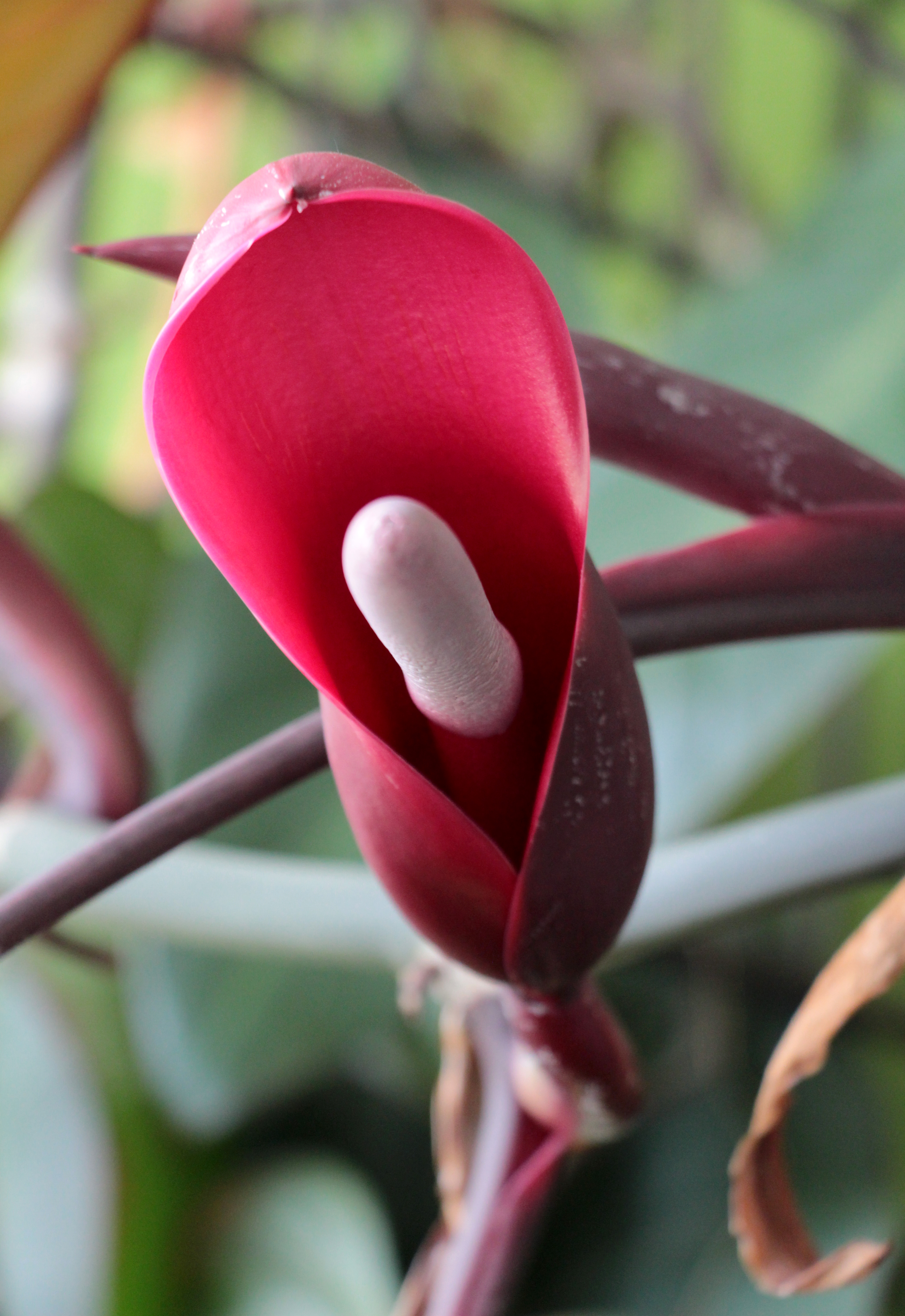
Flower

With a minimum temperature of 15 °C (59 °F), in temperate regions it must be grown under glass or as a houseplant. It prefers indirect or filtered sunlight but will also tolerate lower light conditions. Similarly high humidity is ideal but it will manage with less.

More than a dozen hybrid cultivars of P. erubescens can commonly be found in cultivation, including 'Black Cardinal', 'Burgundy', 'Green Emerald', 'Green Princess', 'Imperial Green', 'Imperial Red', 'McColley’s Finale', 'Moonlight', 'Pink Princess', 'Prince of Orange', 'Red Emerald', 'White Princess', and 'White Wizard'.

Most of these cultivars are considered “self-heading”, and not climbing; in time, they form dense, compact colonies of individual plants, originating from a single larger stalk. The species, as well as some cultivars, have gained the Royal Horticultural Society's Award of Garden Merit.

All parts of P. erubescens are toxic due to calcium oxalate and should be kept away from pets and young children.

== See also ==
- List of Philodendron species
