= Édouard André =

French horticulturalist and architect (1840–1911)

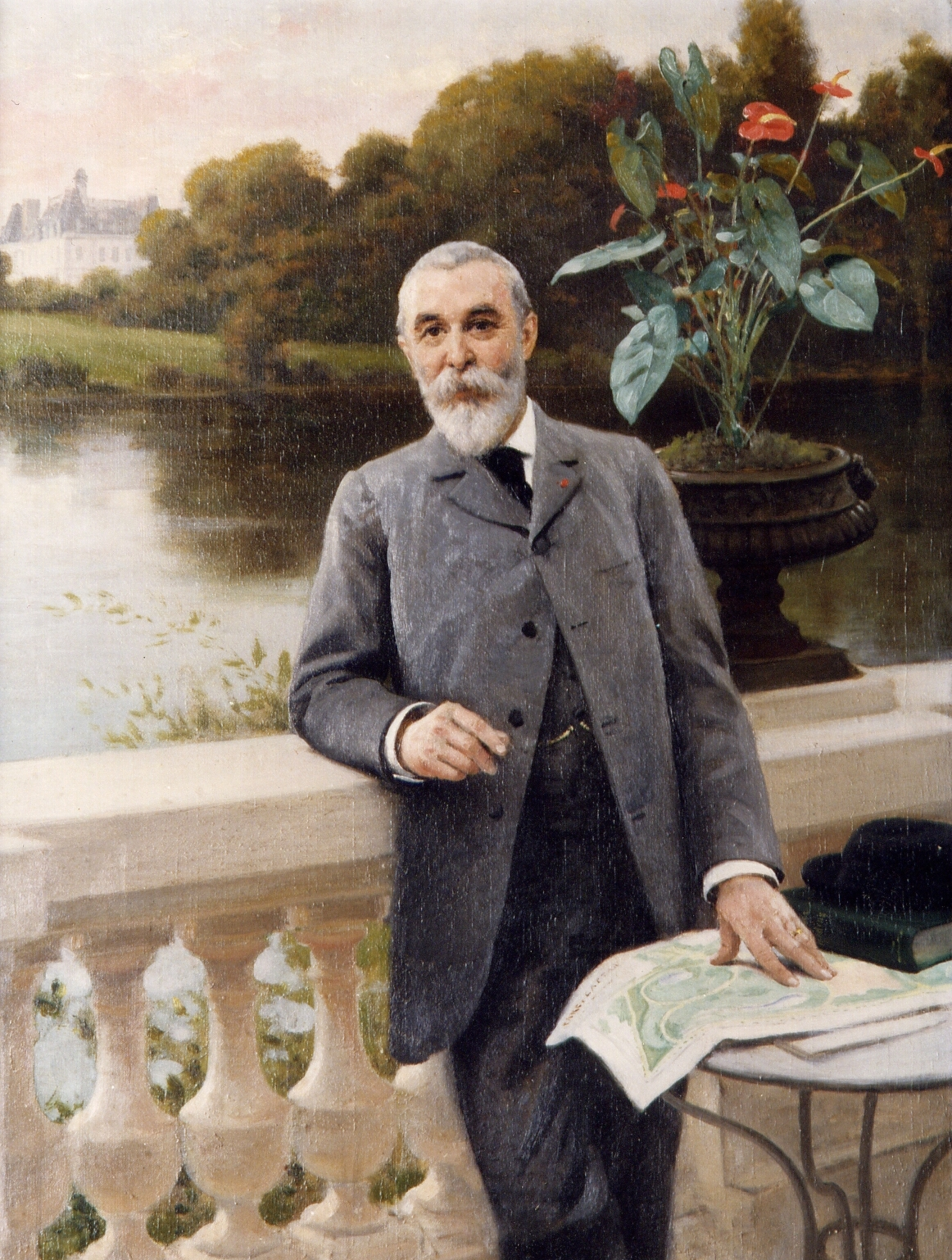
Portrait of André by Édouard Debat-Ponsan

Édouard François André (French pronunciation: [edwaʁ fʁɑ̃swa ɑ̃dʁe]; 17 July 1840 – 25 October 1911) was a French horticulturalist, landscape designer, as well as a leading landscape architect of the late 19th century, famous for designing city parks and public spaces in Lithuania, Liverpool, Monte Carlo and Montevideo.

== Biography ==
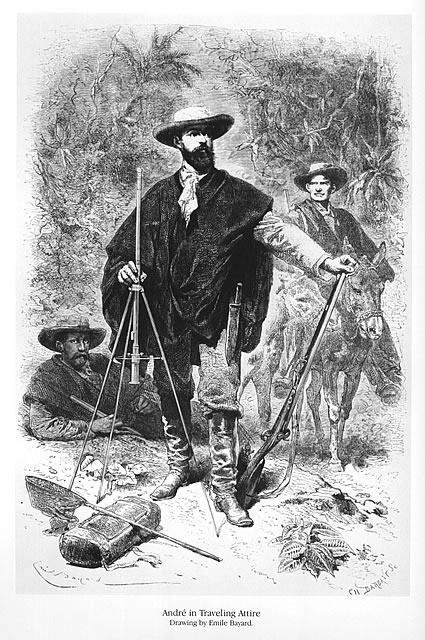
Édouard André during the expedition (by Émile Bayard)

Born into a family of nurserymen in Bourges, Cher, Édouard André assisted Jean-Pierre Barillet-Deschamps in 1860, at the age of twenty, and participated in the redesign of the city of Paris in cooperation with Jean-Charles Adolphe Alphand and Georges-Eugène Haussmann. Eventually he was appointed Head Gardener (Jardinier Principal) of Paris. During eight years of public service he designed and planted many public spaces, including the Parc des Buttes Chaumont and Tuileries Gardens.

His international career was launched in 1866, when he won the competition to design Sefton Park in Liverpool. During his life André designed around a hundred public and private landscape parks, mainly in Europe: the Russian Empire, Austria-Hungary, Switzerland, the Netherlands, Denmark and Bulgaria (the Euxinograd palace park). Among the most famous of them in addition to Sefton Park, Liverpool, are the Municipal Park of Luxembourg City, Funchal Garden in Madeira, Portugal, Weldam Castle Garden in Hof van Twente, Netherlands, public park of Cognac, France and the Villa Borghese gardens, the major public park in Rome. His experience in designing public parks was distilled in Traité général de la composition des parcs et jardins, (Masson, Paris) 1879.

The private parks designed by André include four landscape parks in Lithuania established in Tyszkiewicz nobles' manors: Lentvaris, Trakų Vokė, Užutrakis (near Trakai) and the Palanga Botanical Park. These parks have many distinctive features used by André in his parks: harmonious placement and pleasing arrangement of artificial grottoes, waterfalls, mountain-style stone structures, employment of natural water bodies and panoramas.

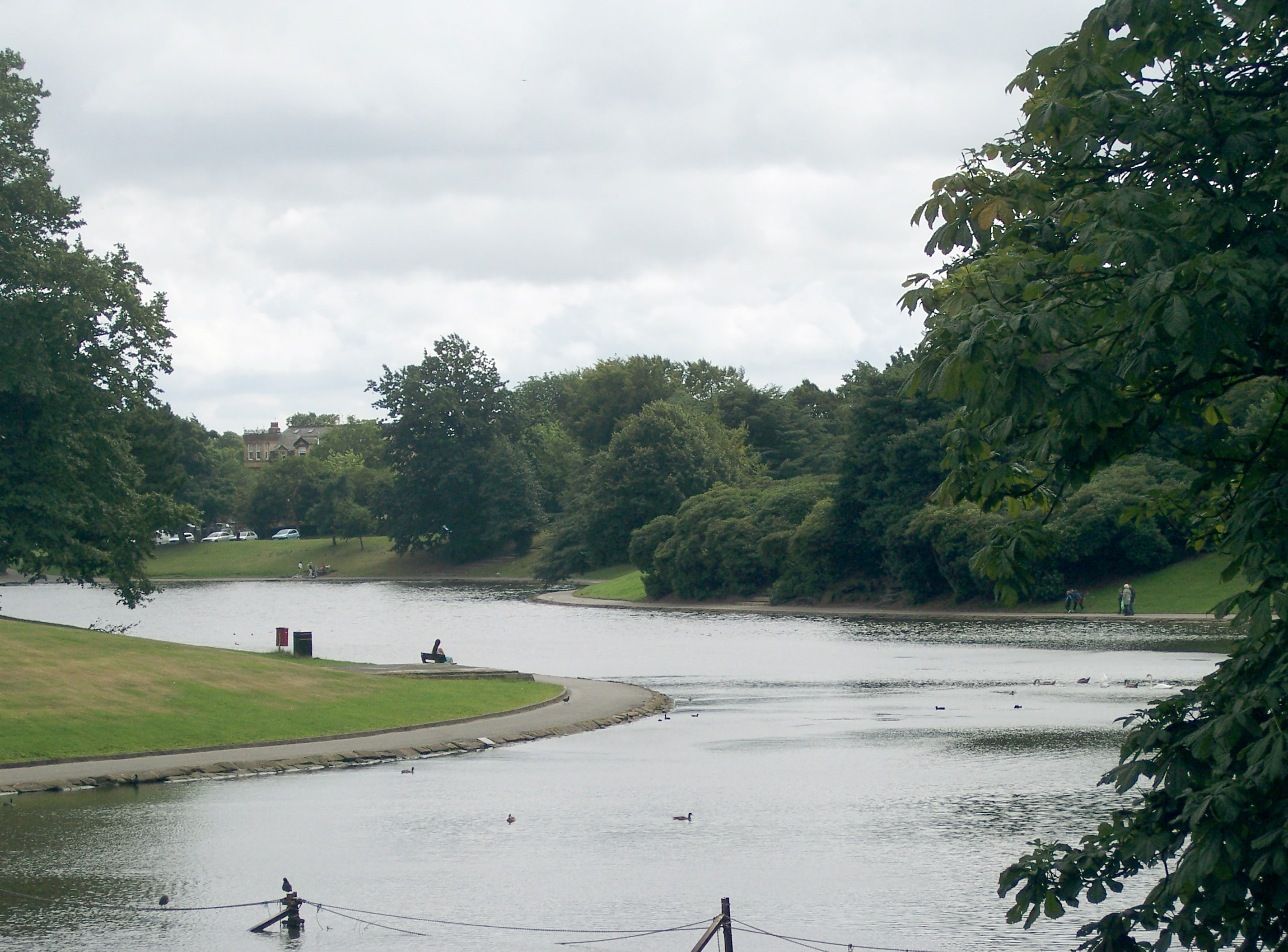
Sefton Park boating lake, designed by André

Édouard André succeeded Charles Antoine Lemaire as editor of L'Illustration Horticole in 1870.

He undertook a botanising trip in the foothills of the Andes in 1875–76 that resulted in the introduction of numerous hardy and tender plants new to European cultivation; his researches resulted in a volume on bromeliads, Bromeliaceae Andreanae. Description et Histoire des Bromeliacées récoltées dans la Colombie, l'Ecuador et la Venezuela, Librairie Agricole, Paris, 1889.

His pupil and assistant, Charles or Carlos Thays went to Buenos Aires in 1889 and was responsible for the planning of tree-lined boulevards and public gardens, resulting in the French atmosphere often noted in that city.

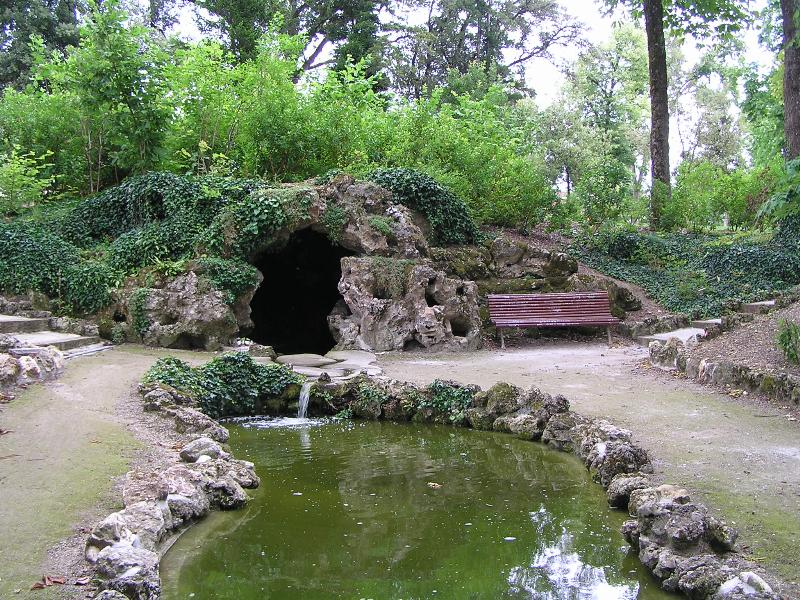
A typical grotto in Cognac

Édouard André died in La Croix-en-Touraine, and was interred in Montmartre Cemetery, Paris.

== Bibliography ==
- Bromeliaceae Andreanae. Description et Histoire des Bromeliacées, récoltées dans la Colombie, l'Ecuador et la Venezuela. Paris: Librairie Agricole, 1889. Nachdruck: Berkeley CA, USA: Big Bridge Press, 1983
- L' art des jardins: traité général de la composition des parcs et jardins. Paris: Masson, 1879. Nachdruck: Marseille: Lafitte Reprints, 1983, ISBN 2-7348-0127-2

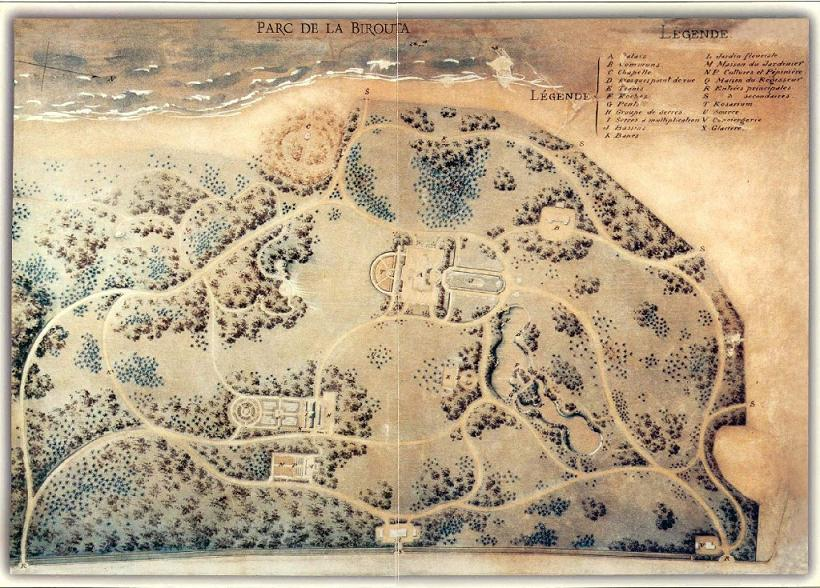
The plan of Palanga Park

== See also ==
- Roseraie du Val-de-Marne
