= Caraguata =

Caraguata may refer to:

- Caraguata (beetle), a genus of insects in the family Chrysomelidae
- Caraguata (plant), a genus of plants in the family Bromeliaceae
