= Kula, Hawaii =

District of Maui

Kula
- Census-designated place
- Location in Hawaii
- Coordinates: 20°47′32″N 156°19′37″W
- Country: United States
- State: Hawaii
- County: Maui

Area
  - Total: 34.54 sq mi (89.5 km^{2})
  - Land: 34.54 sq mi (89.5 km^{2})
  - Water: 0.0 sq mi (0 km^{2})
- Elevation: 2,360 ft (720 m)

Population (2020)
  - Total: 6,942
  - Density: 201/sq mi (78/km^{2})
- Time zone: UTC−10 (Hawaii–Aleutian)
- ZIP code: 96790
- FIPS code: 15-41600
- GNIS feature ID: 2583421

Kula is a census-designated place (CDP) of Maui, Hawaii. It stretches across Upcountry Maui, the western-facing slopes of Haleakalā. Most residential areas lie between about 500 to 1,100 m (1,600 to 3,600 ft) in elevation. The district is distinct from the generally hotter and busier coastal areas. The population of the Kula CDP at the 2020 Census was 6,942, while the larger Kula Census County Division, which includes the communities of upland Keokea and coastal Wailea and Makena, had a population of 12,864.

== Description ==
The ancient district of Kula

Kula roughly extends from Haleakala Highway (Hawaii Route 37) in the north to Keokea in the south—a distance of about 16 miles (26 km) around 20°47'32" N, 156°19'37" W. The largely rural area known as Upper Kula includes the region up-slope (southeast) from Lower Kula, the more densely populated area spread along the Kula Highway.

The word Kula means "dry, open country" in the Hawaiian language.

On Maui, Kula is one of the island's 12 "foundation" districts of ancient Hawaii called moku. The Kula district is the island's largest, extending from dry coastal areas to the wetter high pasture lands of three major ranches (Haleakala, Erewhon, and Ulupalakua) that cap the region about halfway up the slopes of Haleakala. It laterally extends from Keokea to near Makawao where the rainforest of East Maui once began.

In leeward areas, away from the prevailing moist tradewinds—called the rain shadow of Haleakala—the lower portion of Maui consists of a broad, arid expanse where little cultivation of the earth is possible. This zone consists of dry, desert-like open range just inland from the sea in artificially irrigated Kihei, and is covered with kiawe trees to an elevation of about 1,000 feet (300 m) on the volcano's slopes.

Between this zone and the upper reaches of the hillsides, especially up steep Waipoli and Poli Poli Roads, are broad, open areas for vegetable and fruit crops. The moderate climate often yields as many as three or four harvests per year.

When the territorial legislature first set up the political design in 1906, they decreed only two levels of government: state and county. Consequently, Hawaii's towns do not have specific boundaries or "city limits". There are also no official district boundaries for Maui County elections.

=== Upper Kula ===
The twisty Haleakala Highway, from its junction with Kula Highway in Pukalani, loosely defines the northern edge of Upper Kula. The upper road (Kekaulike Avenue), also known as State Highway 377, leads up through usually green pastures, silver eucalyptus tree groves (and blue jacaranda trees in late spring), contrasting to the sugarcane below. Where the road beyond Kula Lodge makes an abrupt upward tack to Haleakala National Park, the area known as Upper Kula surrounds Kekaulike Avenue. In less than five miles it descends the slope to rejoin the Kula Highway near Rice Park and heads south to Keokea.

There is little commercial development along Kekaulike except Kula Botanical Garden and Aliʻi Kula Lavender Farm. Vegetable and flower gardens surround the meandering highway as farmers take advantage of the area's unique combination of open space, good soil, moisture-laden clouds and filtered tropical sun.

New homes dot the area, taking advantage of the moderate weather and bi-coastal views of the isthmus below.

In Keokea, the Kula Hospital sits on the hillside above the road. Originally a tuberculosis treatment sanatorium built in 1909, Kula Hospital now serves the community as a critical access hospital.

The southern edge of Kula had a once-flourishing Chinese community that numbered over 700 immigrant workers and farmers. While the area is now more mixed, Keokea is still home to a pair of Chinese family-owned stores and a service station as well as a boutique coffee-shop.

At 2,400 feet (730 m), a mile or so beyond Keokea, between mile markers 18 and 19 on the Kula highway (aka Highway 37), is the county park dedicated to Maui's former resident, Sun Yat-sen, called the "father of modern China". He grew up in the area in the late 19th century living with his brother Sun Mei (孫眉). He led the revolution that ended China's last dynasty and established the Republic of China in 1912.

Just as upcountry residents visit the seashore, residents near the shore sometimes visit Upper Kula to enjoy cooler temperatures that may require a fireplace in winter. A popular saying is "It's cooler in Kula."

=== Lower Kula ===
Lower Kula lies between about 1,200 and 2,800 feet (370 and 850 m) of elevation along the western flank of Haleakalā, the dormant volcano that dominates the island's landscape and is the foundation of Kula’s backdrop.

Communities along the old Lower Kula Road with names like Pulehu, Waiakoa, Omaopio and Keokea each have unique history of ethnic settlement. In the late 19th century, Portuguese and Chinese immigrants, who fulfilled labor contracts with the sugarcane plantations, moved to this area. Later, Japanese farmers moved into the area for its fertile earth.

These farmers have been producing vegetables ever since. In fact, during the California gold rush the farmers in Kula shipped so many potatoes that it was nicknamed "Nu Kaleponi," a Hawaiian pronunciation of "New California."

That farming tradition continues today, even among the gentlemen farmers and their farms that have sprung up in the past two decades. Kula grows its well-known onions, lettuce, potatoes, jicama, tomatoes, carrots, cauliflower and cabbage. It is also a major source of cut flowers for the state. Most of Hawaii's proteas, as well as nearly all the carnations used in leis, come from Kula.

Lower Kula encompasses the areas around Lower Kula Road, the old county road that once spanned the region before Kula Highway was finished in 1964. The old meandering road crosses the straight modern highway several times between Pukalani and Keokea.

Even after nearly 50 years, there are few businesses along the highway, while the old road has the usual establishments that serve rural communities, including historic churches. Holy Ghost Catholic Church has a unique octagonal shape and hand-carved altar. Its turret is a landmark on the slopes of Haleakala, visible from much of Central Maui below. It was constructed in 1894 by Portuguese immigrants.

In the past decade, the lush views and cooler climate of Lower Kula have drawn a new type of resident. Agricultural lands are carved up for "gentleman estates" with large homes. Clusters of homes around old Lower Kula Road are becoming denser.

The major limit on the further development in the whole Kula area is the significant lack of water. This basic resource is key to the sustainability of the area. The Upcountry Community Plan gives highest priority to the water supply of agriculture and the Hawaiian Homelands project.

== Demographics ==
=== 2020 census ===
As of the 2020 census, Kula had a population of 6,942. At the same census, the larger Kula Census County Division, which includes the communities of upland Keokea and coastal Wailea and Makena, had a population of 12,864. The median age was 50.3 years. 18.1% of residents were under the age of 18 and 26.5% of residents were 65 years of age or older. For every 100 females there were 97.2 males, and for every 100 females age 18 and over there were 98.9 males age 18 and over.

0.0% of residents lived in urban areas, while 100.0% lived in rural areas.

There were 2,769 households in Kula, of which 25.7% had children under the age of 18 living in them. Of all households, 51.1% were married-couple households, 17.2% were households with a male householder and no spouse or partner present, and 24.4% were households with a female householder and no spouse or partner present. About 23.8% of all households were made up of individuals and 11.7% had someone living alone who was 65 years of age or older.

There were 3,035 housing units, of which 8.8% were vacant. The homeowner vacancy rate was 0.5% and the rental vacancy rate was 2.0%.

Racial composition as of the 2020 census
Race	Number	Percent
White	3,710	53.4%
Black or African American	30	0.4%
American Indian and Alaska Native	27	0.4%
Asian	954	13.7%
Native Hawaiian and Other Pacific Islander	317	4.6%
Some other race	146	2.1%
Two or more races	1,758	25.3%
Hispanic or Latino (of any race)	600	8.6%

== Climate ==
There are many micro-climates created by the combined effects of elevation, rain shadow, and land contour. Much of the west slopes of East Maui are dry or semi-desert due to a rain shadow effect: the prevailing trade-winds are from the north-east and east and Kula is in the "shadow" of these winds. According to the National Oceanic and Atmospheric Administration, Kula is the coolest place in Hawai'i, as defined by having the lowest average annual temperatures (average low temperature: 55.7 °F and average low temperature during coldest month, February: 52.6 °F). At the higher elevations and at night, especially in winter, temperatures dip into the 40s or high 30s (°F). Frosts are virtually unknown except at much higher elevations (7,000 ft or 2,100 m) on Haleakala.

There is a distinctive weather feature known as the "Maui vortex". A wind vortex forms as the trade-winds pass around the north-west corner of Haleakala (over Pukalani) and blow southward down the central valley of Maui over Maalaea Bay and then circle back up-slope over Kihei bringing a "lei of clouds" late most mornings over Kula. Around sunset, the downward breezes from the summit wipe out these clouds.

Kula displays a warm summer Mediterranean Climate (Köppen climate classification Csb)

Climate data for Kula, Hawaii (1991–2020 normals, extremes 1978–present)
Month	Jan	Feb	Mar	Apr	May	Jun	Jul	Aug	Sep	Oct	Nov	Dec	Year
Record high °F (°C)	81 (27)	83 (28)	82 (28)	79 (26)	81 (27)	83 (28)	85 (29)	89 (32)	86 (30)	82 (28)	84 (29)	82 (28)	89 (32)
Mean maximum °F (°C)	73.5 (23.1)	73.0 (22.8)	73.5 (23.1)	74.9 (23.8)	75.9 (24.4)	77.3 (25.2)	79.3 (26.3)	80.2 (26.8)	79.5 (26.4)	78.6 (25.9)	76.2 (24.6)	74.7 (23.7)	81.9 (27.7)
Mean daily maximum °F (°C)	68.1 (20.1)	67.9 (19.9)	68.6 (20.3)	70.2 (21.2)	71.3 (21.8)	73.2 (22.9)	74.8 (23.8)	75.7 (24.3)	75.0 (23.9)	74.1 (23.4)	71.9 (22.2)	69.6 (20.9)	71.7 (22.1)
Daily mean °F (°C)	60.6 (15.9)	60.4 (15.8)	61.0 (16.1)	62.3 (16.8)	63.6 (17.6)	65.1 (18.4)	66.6 (19.2)	67.3 (19.6)	66.9 (19.4)	66.2 (19.0)	64.2 (17.9)	62.1 (16.7)	63.9 (17.7)
Mean daily minimum °F (°C)	53.1 (11.7)	52.8 (11.6)	53.4 (11.9)	54.4 (12.4)	55.9 (13.3)	57.1 (13.9)	58.3 (14.6)	58.9 (14.9)	58.8 (14.9)	58.2 (14.6)	56.6 (13.7)	54.5 (12.5)	56.0 (13.3)
Mean minimum °F (°C)	47.5 (8.6)	47.0 (8.3)	48.4 (9.1)	50.6 (10.3)	52.1 (11.2)	54.5 (12.5)	55.3 (12.9)	56.0 (13.3)	56.1 (13.4)	55.1 (12.8)	52.4 (11.3)	50.5 (10.3)	45.6 (7.6)
Record low °F (°C)	36 (2)	42 (6)	44 (7)	45 (7)	43 (6)	51 (11)	53 (12)	52 (11)	52 (11)	50 (10)	48 (9)	45 (7)	36 (2)
Average rainfall inches (mm)	3.04 (77)	2.71 (69)	3.58 (91)	1.38 (35)	1.48 (38)	0.77 (20)	0.93 (24)	1.45 (37)	1.36 (35)	1.83 (46)	1.84 (47)	2.63 (67)	23.00 (584)
Average rainy days (≥ 0.01 in)	8.1	9.1	10.0	6.8	7.9	6.3	6.2	5.7	6.8	6.6	6.3	6.9	86.7
Source: NOAA

Climate data for Kula Hospital, Hawaii (1991–2020 normals, extremes 1916–present)
Month	Jan	Feb	Mar	Apr	May	Jun	Jul	Aug	Sep	Oct	Nov	Dec	Year
Record high °F (°C)	84 (29)	85 (29)	88 (31)	83 (28)	85 (29)	91 (33)	88 (31)	89 (32)	87 (31)	84 (29)	84 (29)	87 (31)	91 (33)
Mean maximum °F (°C)	73.9 (23.3)	73.4 (23.0)	73.9 (23.3)	73.8 (23.2)	75.9 (24.4)	76.5 (24.7)	78.1 (25.6)	78.6 (25.9)	78.1 (25.6)	77.3 (25.2)	75.2 (24.0)	73.9 (23.3)	80.1 (26.7)
Mean daily maximum °F (°C)	67.9 (19.9)	67.7 (19.8)	68.3 (20.2)	69.8 (21.0)	70.8 (21.6)	73.0 (22.8)	74.3 (23.5)	74.9 (23.8)	74.5 (23.6)	73.2 (22.9)	71.4 (21.9)	68.8 (20.4)	71.2 (21.8)
Daily mean °F (°C)	59.6 (15.3)	59.5 (15.3)	60.2 (15.7)	61.5 (16.4)	62.7 (17.1)	64.3 (17.9)	65.5 (18.6)	66.2 (19.0)	66.0 (18.9)	65.0 (18.3)	63.3 (17.4)	60.9 (16.1)	62.9 (17.2)
Mean daily minimum °F (°C)	51.4 (10.8)	51.3 (10.7)	52.1 (11.2)	53.1 (11.7)	54.6 (12.6)	55.7 (13.2)	56.7 (13.7)	57.5 (14.2)	57.5 (14.2)	56.8 (13.8)	55.3 (12.9)	52.9 (11.6)	54.6 (12.6)
Mean minimum °F (°C)	46.1 (7.8)	46.1 (7.8)	47.6 (8.7)	49.8 (9.9)	51.8 (11.0)	52.8 (11.6)	53.8 (12.1)	54.9 (12.7)	55.0 (12.8)	53.7 (12.1)	51.5 (10.8)	48.9 (9.4)	44.4 (6.9)
Record low °F (°C)	38 (3)	41 (5)	38 (3)	43 (6)	46 (8)	44 (7)	39 (4)	50 (10)	49 (9)	48 (9)	46 (8)	41 (5)	38 (3)
Average rainfall inches (mm)	3.87 (98)	2.85 (72)	3.35 (85)	2.13 (54)	2.79 (71)	1.20 (30)	2.07 (53)	1.98 (50)	2.73 (69)	2.74 (70)	2.44 (62)	2.83 (72)	30.98 (787)
Average rainy days (≥ 0.01 in)	6.0	6.7	7.3	5.7	7.3	6.0	6.1	5.4	7.5	5.9	5.6	5.5	75.0
Source: NOAA

== Land use ==
Kula has a strong agricultural and ranching tradition, the latter on the lands above the residential areas. Indeed, there is frequent reference in Makawao (which means "edge of the forest") to a paniolo (cowboy) ambiance that derives from this ranching activity.

The Maui onion mostly grows at the lower levels of Kula (below Highway 37). It is also known for its persimmons that ripen during the fall; many are located in the Pulehuiki area. Other produce grown in Kula includes lettuce, cabbage, and herbs. Kula is also known for the many varieties of protea grown for commercial sale.

== Education ==
Hawaii Department of Education operates public schools. Kula Elementary School is in Kula. Its September 1964 opening stemmed from a combination of Kealahou, Keokea, and Makena, and Ulupalakua schools. Kalama Intermediate School is the area intermediate school.

== Notable residents ==
- Jeff Cotton, guitarist
- Mick Fleetwood, musician, co-founder of band Fleetwood Mac
- Linda Nagata, science fiction and fantasy author
- Wade Robson, Australian dancer and choreographer
- Hannibal Tavares, Mayor of Maui (1979-1991)
- Kanekoa Texeira, Major League Baseball pitcher
- Sun Yat-Sen, founding father and first president of the Republic of China.
- Oprah Winfrey, Is an American talk show host, television producer, actress, author, and media proprietor.

== Points of interest ==
- Enchanting Floral Gardens of Kula, Maui
- Holy Ghost Catholic Church (Kula, Hawaii)
