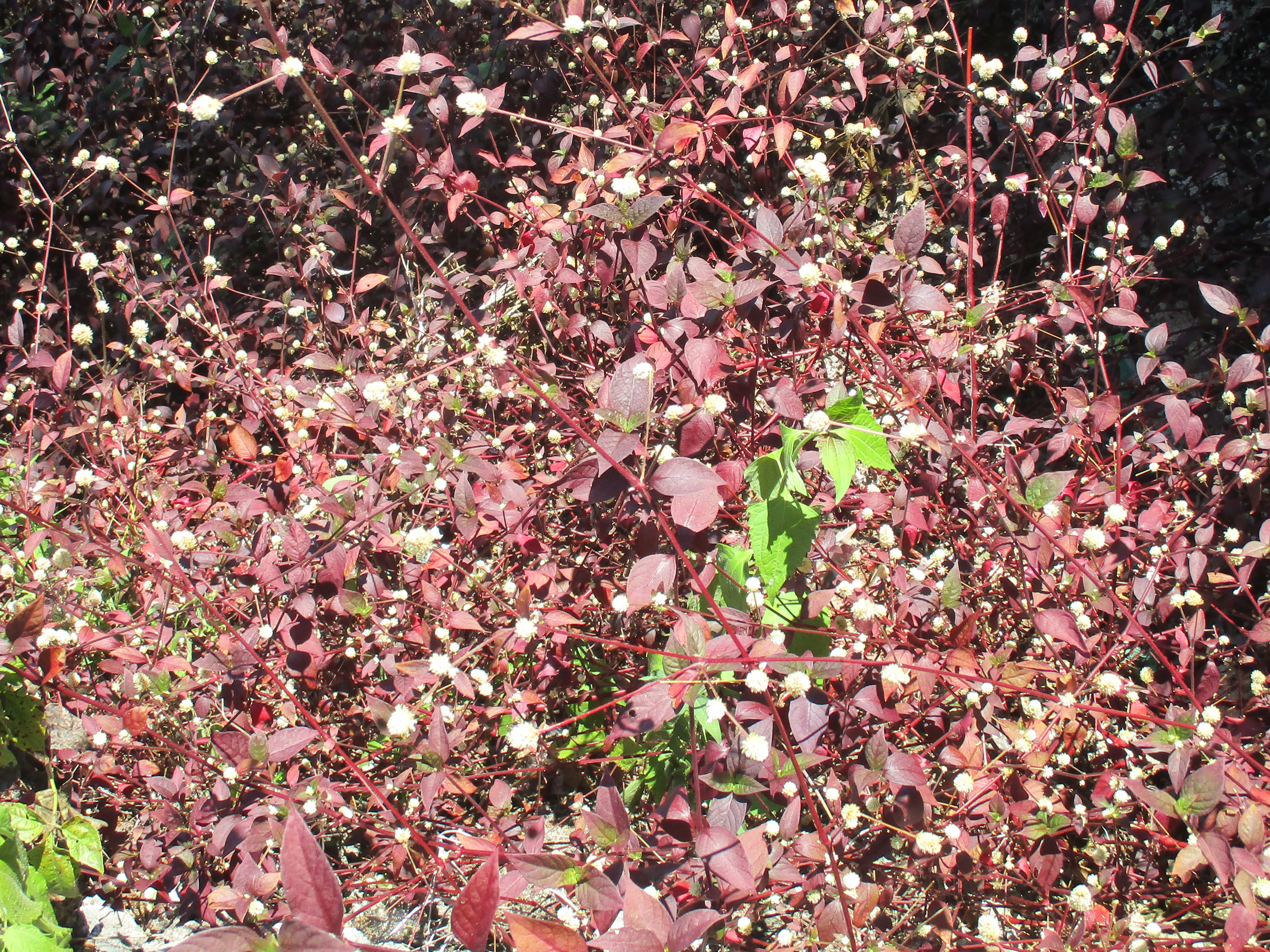

Scientific classification
- Kingdom: Plantae
- Clade: Tracheophytes
- Clade: Angiosperms
- Clade: Eudicots
- Order: Caryophyllales
- Family: Amaranthaceae
- Genus: Alternanthera
- Species: A. brasiliana

Binomial name
- Alternanthera brasiliana (L.) Kuntze (1891)

Varieties
- Alternanthera brasiliana var. brasiliana; Alternanthera brasiliana var. villosa (Moq.) Kuntze

Synonyms
- Achyranthes brasiliana (L.) Standl. (1915); Alternanthera dentata Scheygr. (1932), nom. superfl.; Gomphrena brasiliana L. (1759) (basionym); Gomphrena brasiliensis Jacq. (1789), nom. superfl.; Gomphrena dentata Moench (1802), nom. superfl.; Philoxerus brasiliana (L.) Sm. (1814); Telanthera brasiliana (L.) Moq. (1849); Telanthera brasiliensis Endl. (1842), nom. superfl.; Telanthera dentata Moq. (1849), nom. superfl.

= Alternanthera brasiliana =

Species of plant

Alternanthera brasiliana, also known as large purple alternanthera, metal weed, bloodleaf, parrot leaf, ruby leaf, Brazilian joyweed, purple alternanthera, purple joyweed, is a flowering plant of the amaranth family that is native to the forests of South America and as well as Central America, ranging from northeastern Mexico to northeastern Argentina. It is grown as an ornamental plant.

Alternanthera brasiliana var. villosa, a variety known as little ruby or ruby leaf alternanthera, is also known by the synonym Alternanthera dentata.

== Description ==
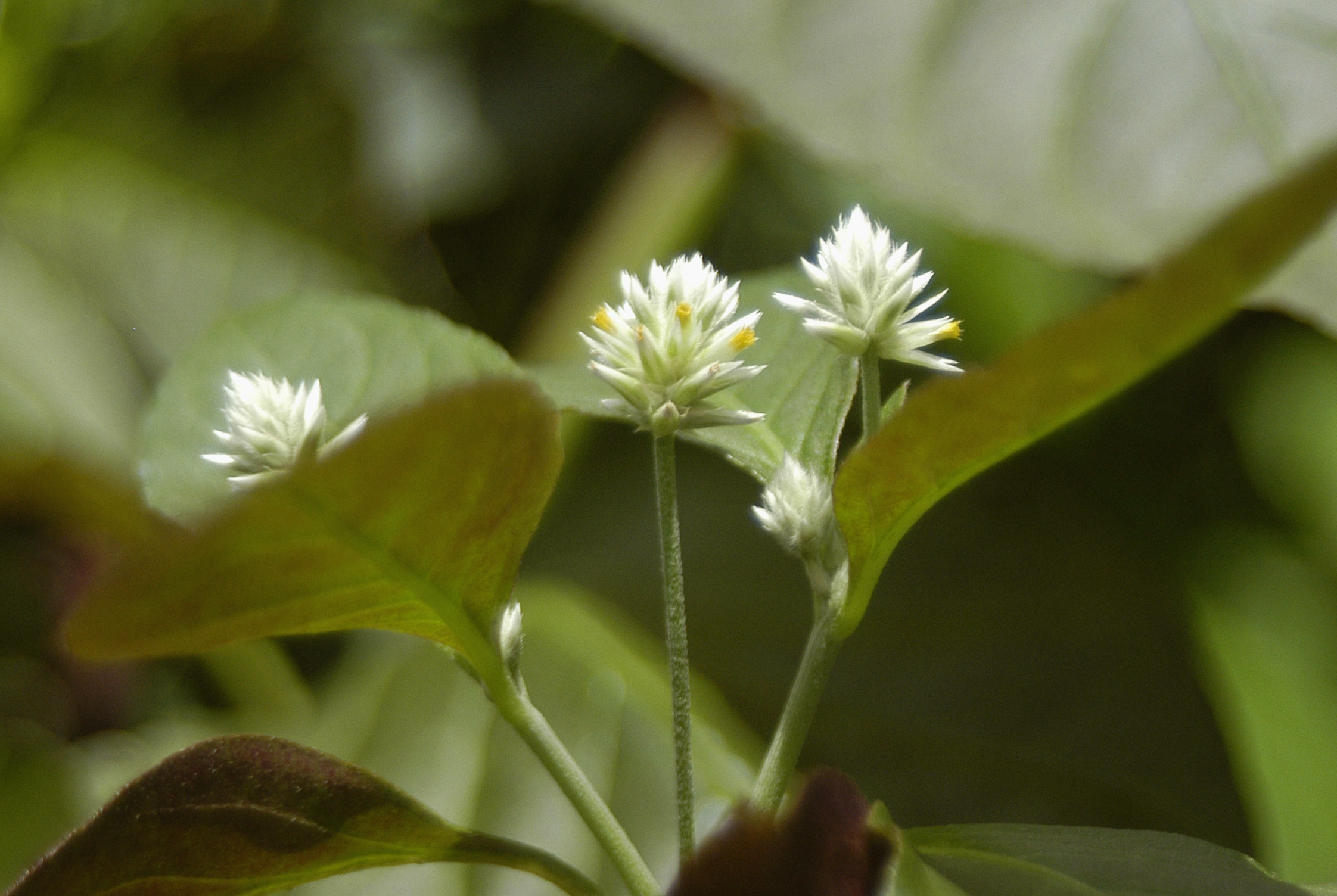
Flowers

It is an erect, sprawling, herbaceous plant that may grow up to 3 metres tall, though it is usually less than 1 metre as a cultivated plant. The plant's stems, which range between red, green and purple, are delicately hirsute when juvenile, though they'd become glabrescent as they get older. Its opposite leaves, which are 1–10 cm long and 0.7–5 cm wide, are usually coloured purple-specked or luminous reddish-purple. It may lose some of its leaves in winter, making it partially "deciduous" in places that have slightly cool winters.

Its vanilla-coloured, pom-pom flowers are ordered in compact clusters (7–20 mm long) in the top leaf branching and are small in shape. These clusters are rounded to slightly lengthened in shape and are foaled on stalks which are normally 3–10 cm long. It can flower any time of the year, but in temperate and cooler subtropical climates it flowers more often in winter. Its very small brown fruit (1.5–2 mm long) contains one seed that's generally hidden within the older flower parts.

== Varieties ==
Two varieties are accepted.

- Alternanthera brasiliana var. brasiliana – northeastern Mexico to central Brazil
- Alternanthera brasiliana var. villosa (Moq.) Kuntze - southeastern Mexico to northeastern Argentina.

== Cultivation ==
It is used as an ornamental plant with many cultivars, such as 'Purple Prince' and 'Little Ruby' (used for the Alternanthera brasiliana var. villosa cultivars). It is often harvested from the wild for regional use as a food and medicine, where it is used as an antiviral and anti-diarrhoea agent. It grows in full sun in moist, well drained soils, where it will multiply by self-seeding. It can also be easily propagated by cuttings.

== Range ==
The plant is native to Brazil, Peru, Ecuador, Colombia, Venezuela, the Guyanas, Nicaragua, Belize, Guatemala, Mexico, northeastern Argentina, Trinidad and Tobago, Aruba, and the Windward Islands.

Moreover, it is naturalised in the wilderness and cultivated land in west Africa, coastal districts of northern and eastern Australia, Florida, South Africa, some of the Pacific Islands, and in shaded ravine slopes and creeks in Java. Most species of joyweed, including this one, are considered as environmental weeds in Queensland, New South Wales, the Northern Territory, and Western Australia.

== Gallery ==
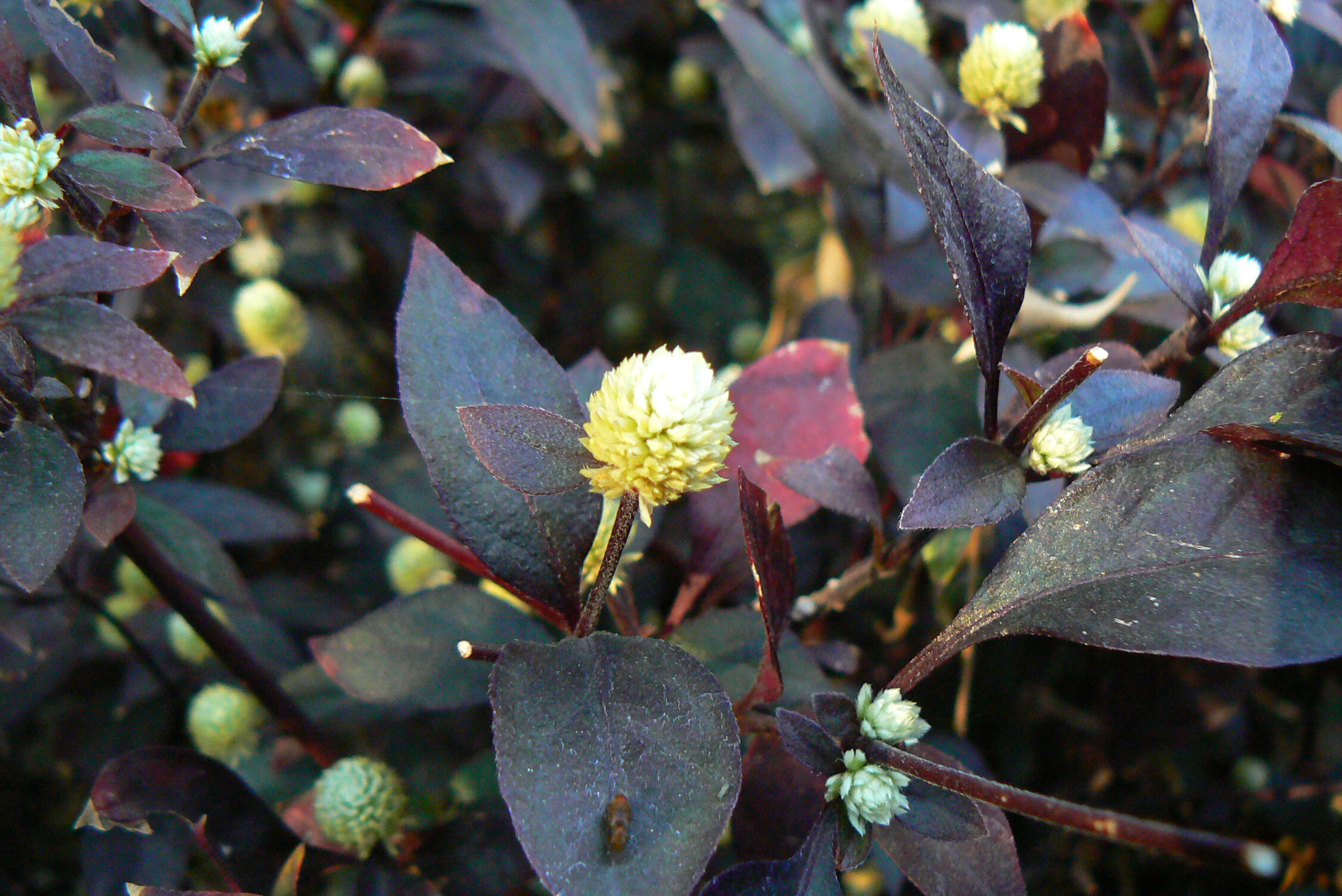
Cultivated variety with purple leaves

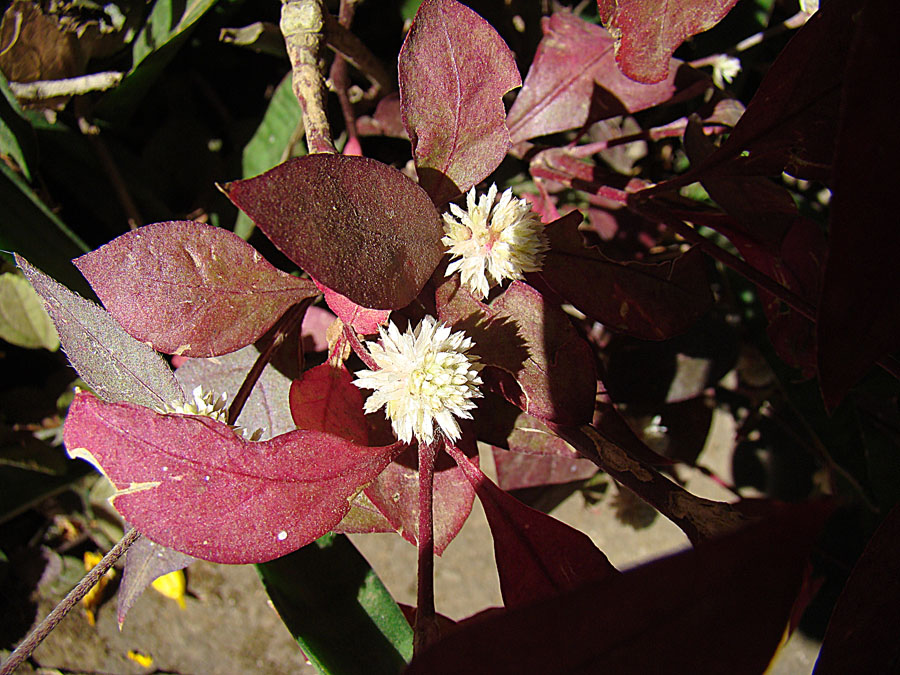
Maroon-leaved variety

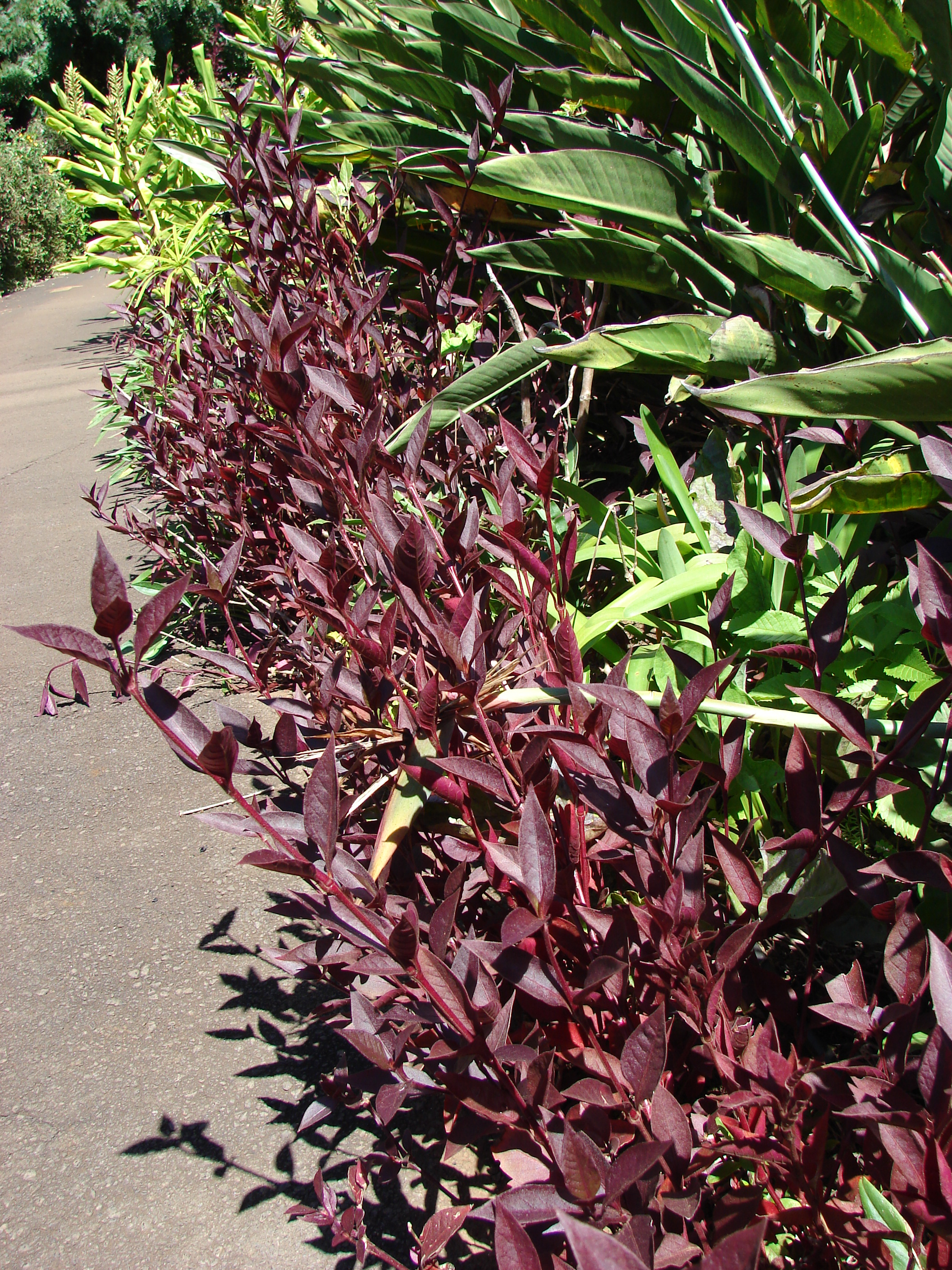
Shrub in Enchanted Floral Gardens of Kula, Maui

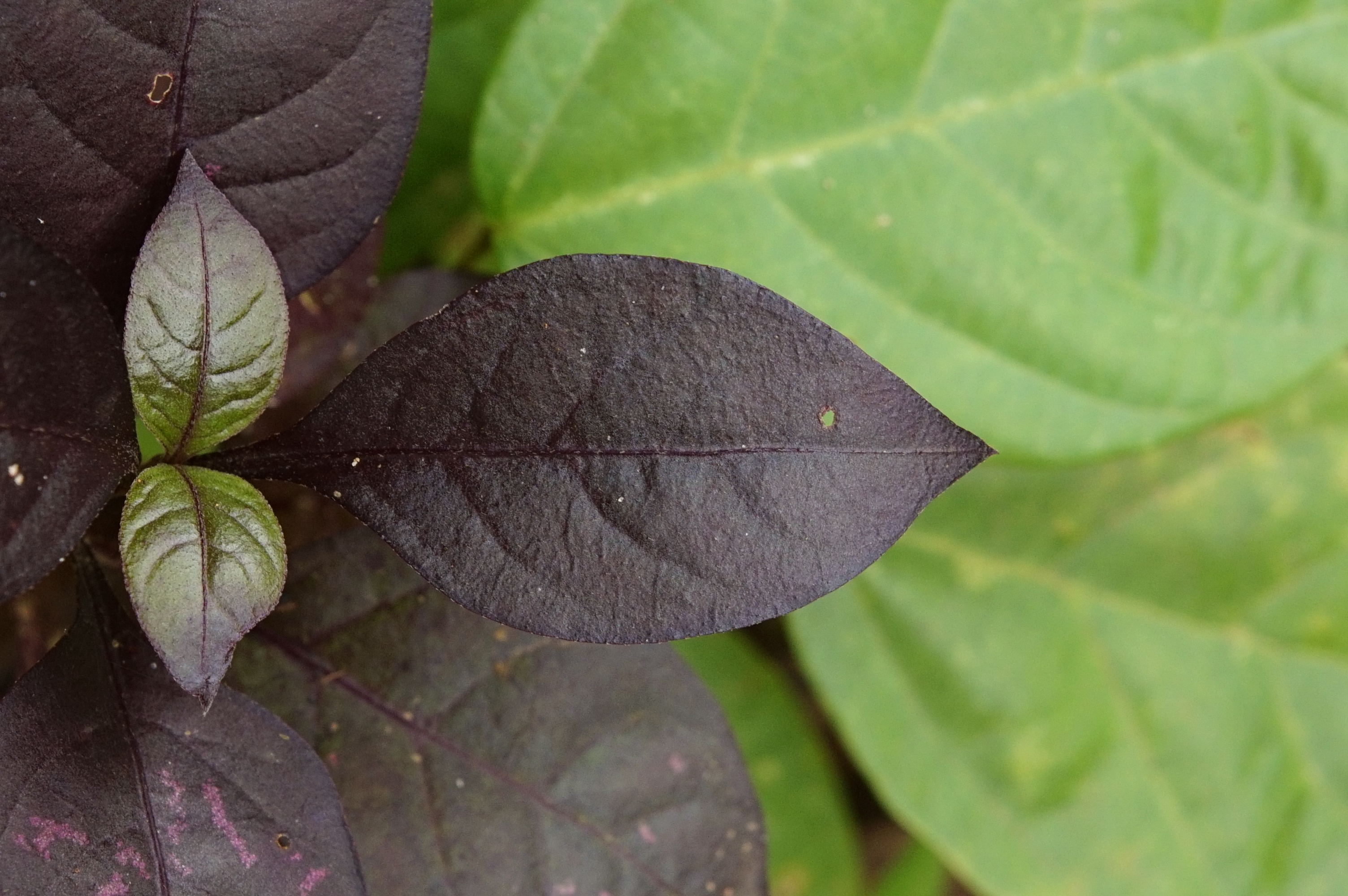
Leaf closeup

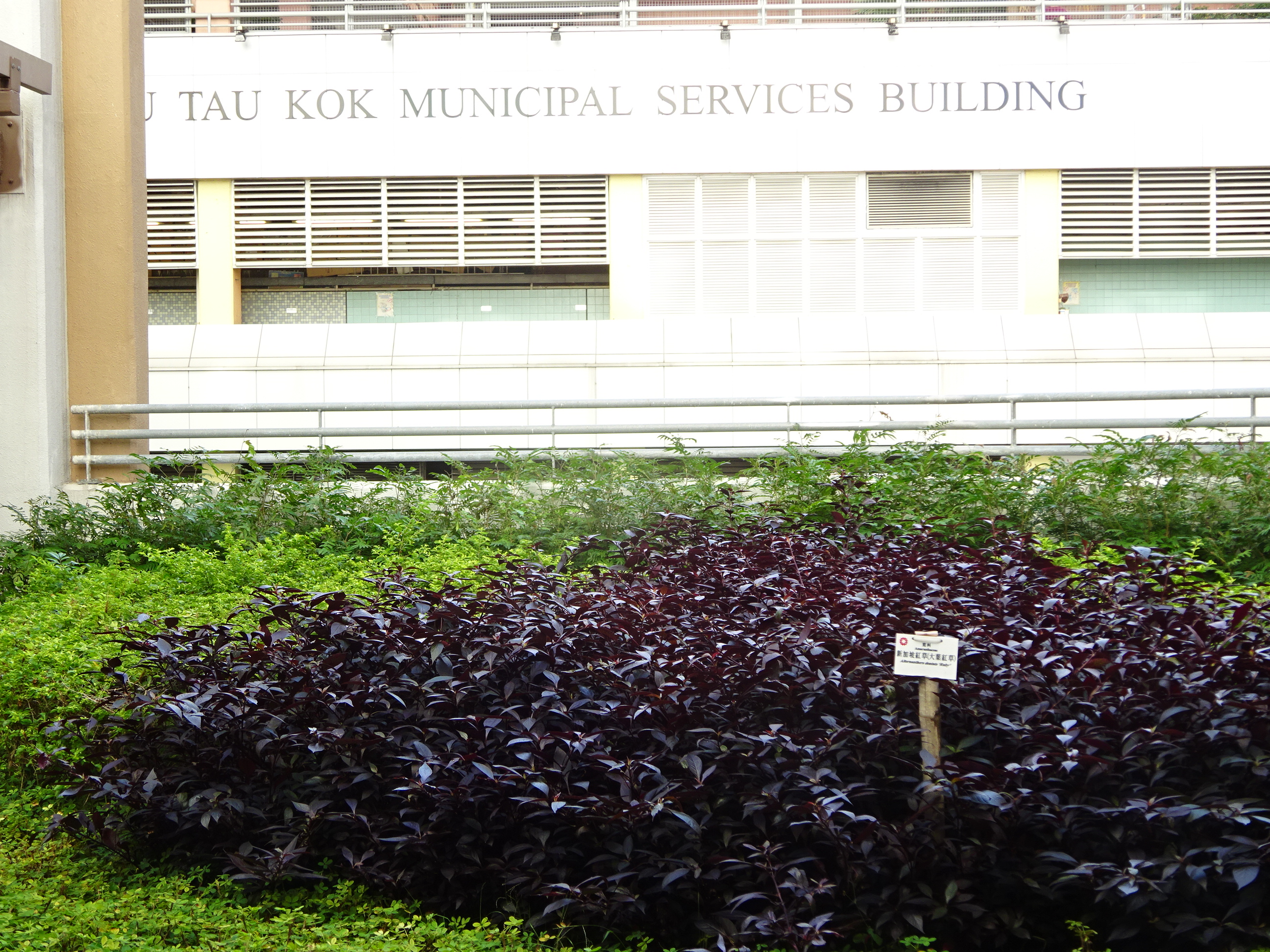
Shrub setting

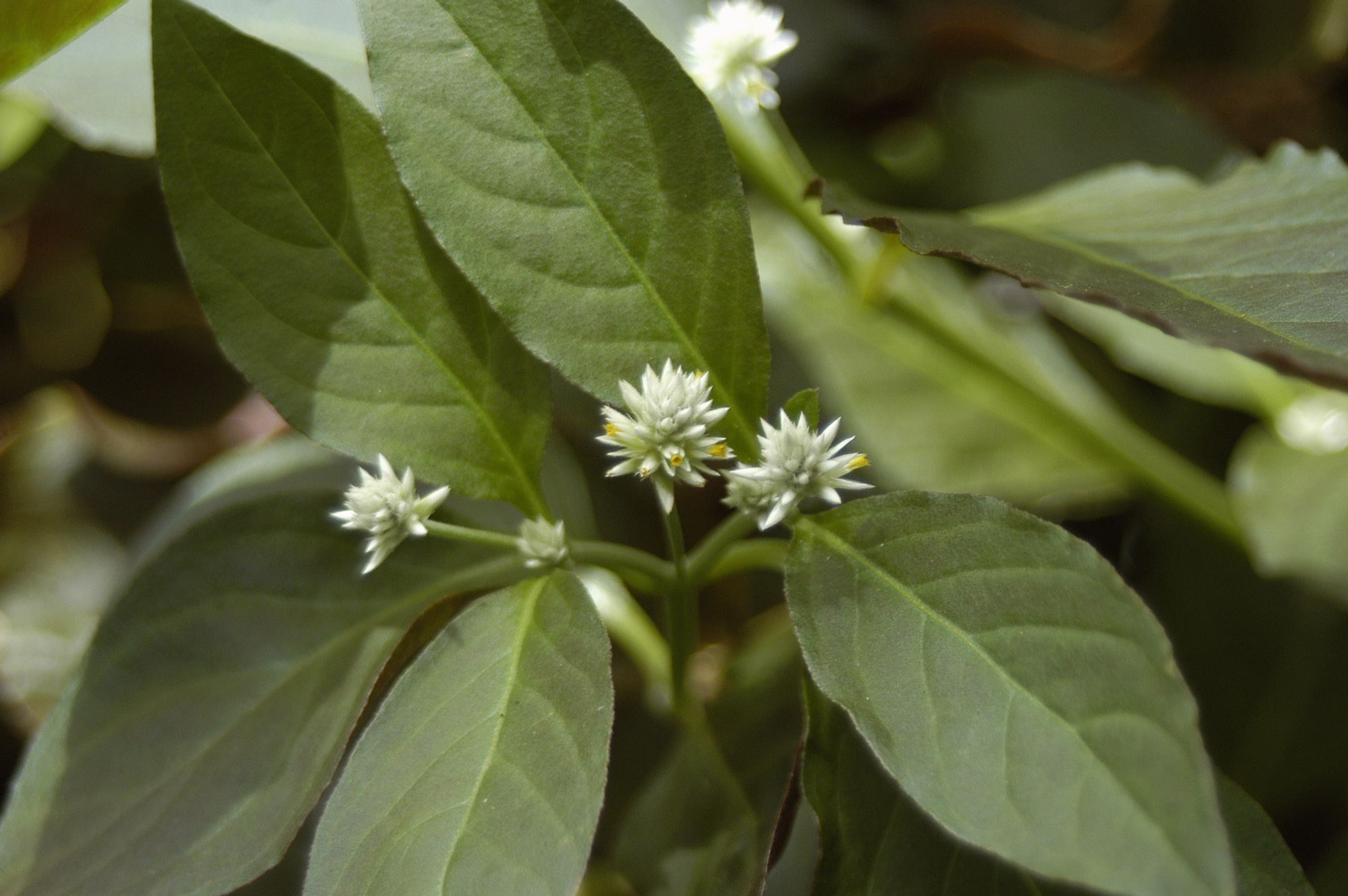
Green leaves and flower

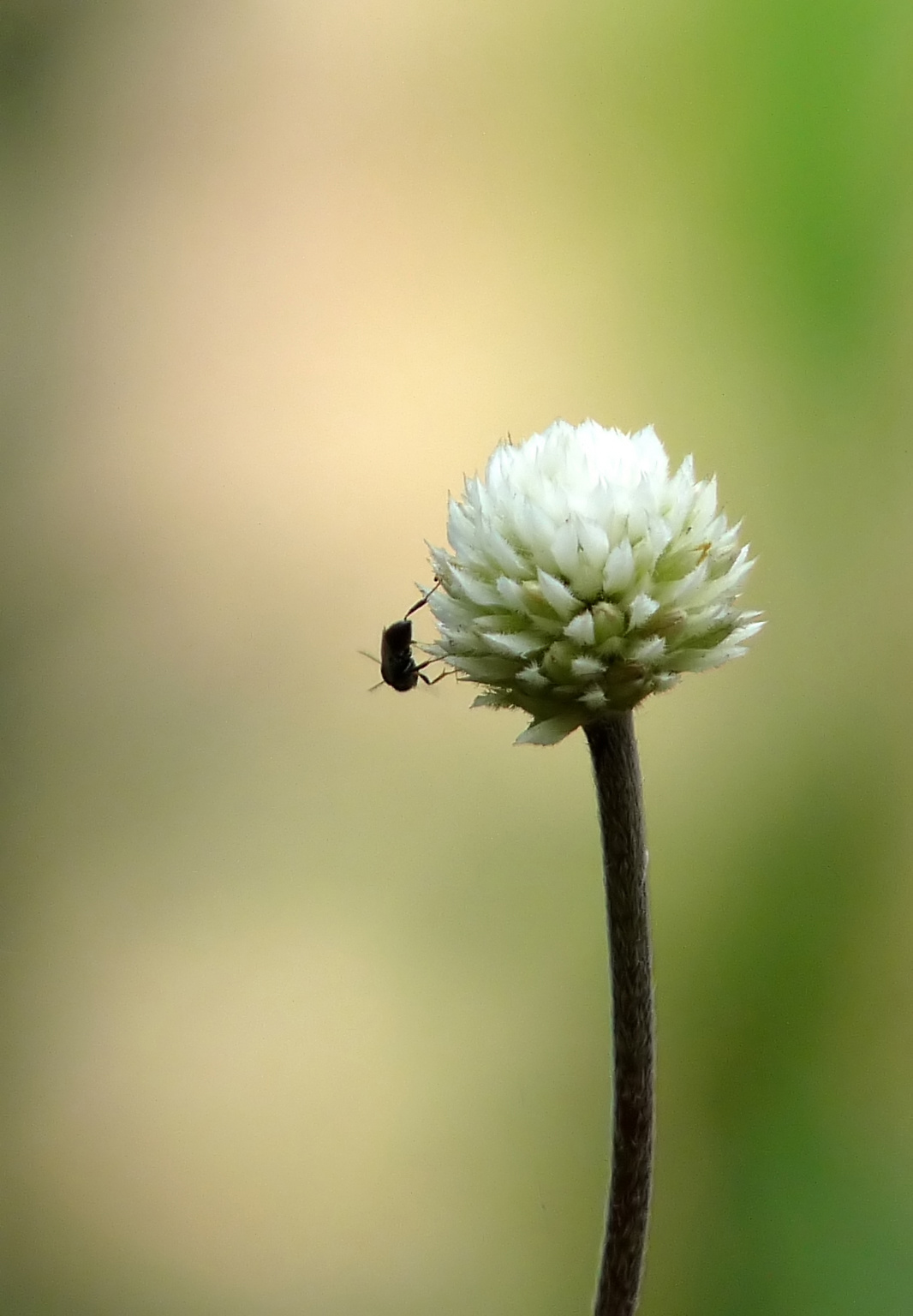
Flower closeup

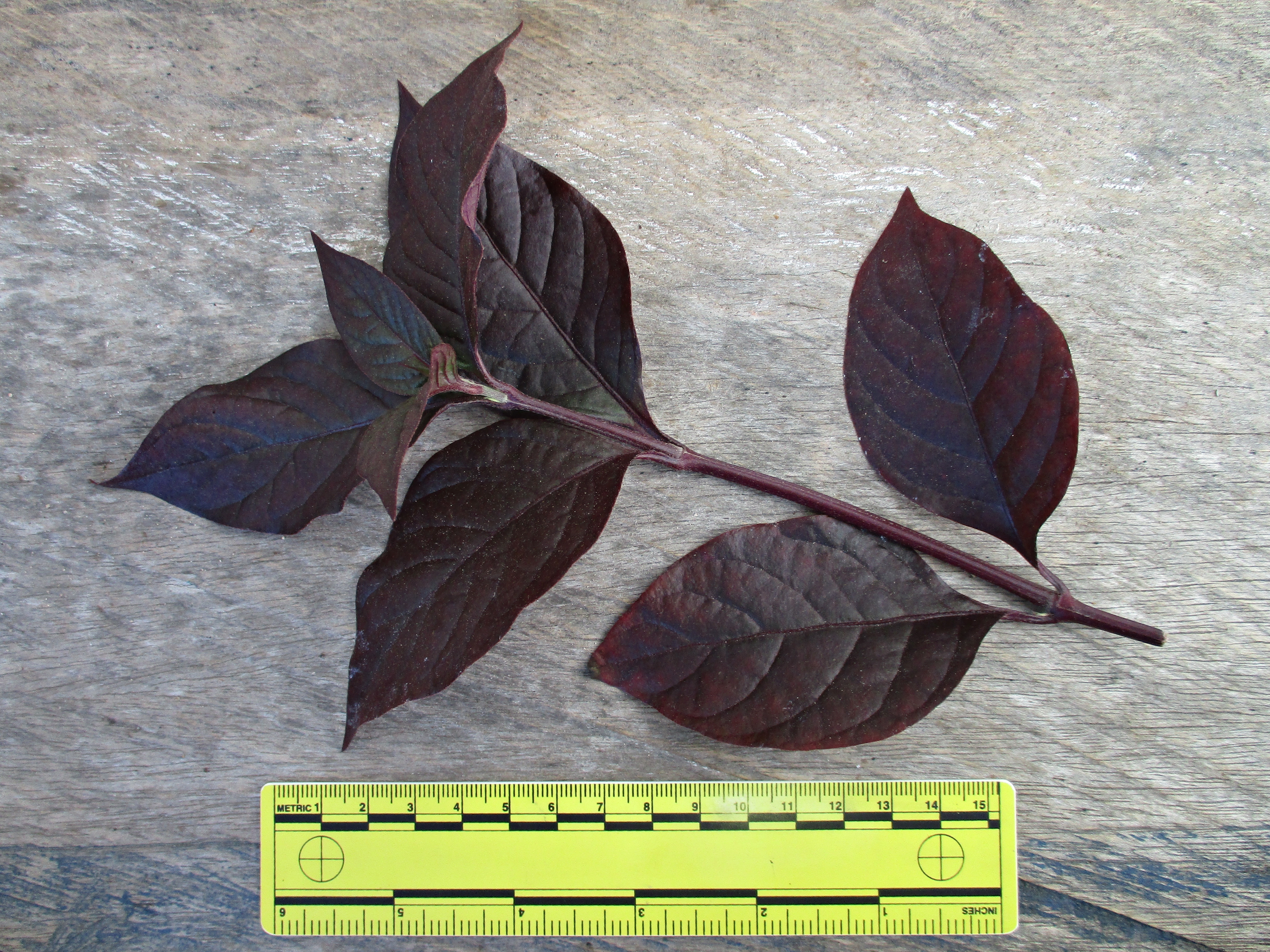
Ruled leaves
