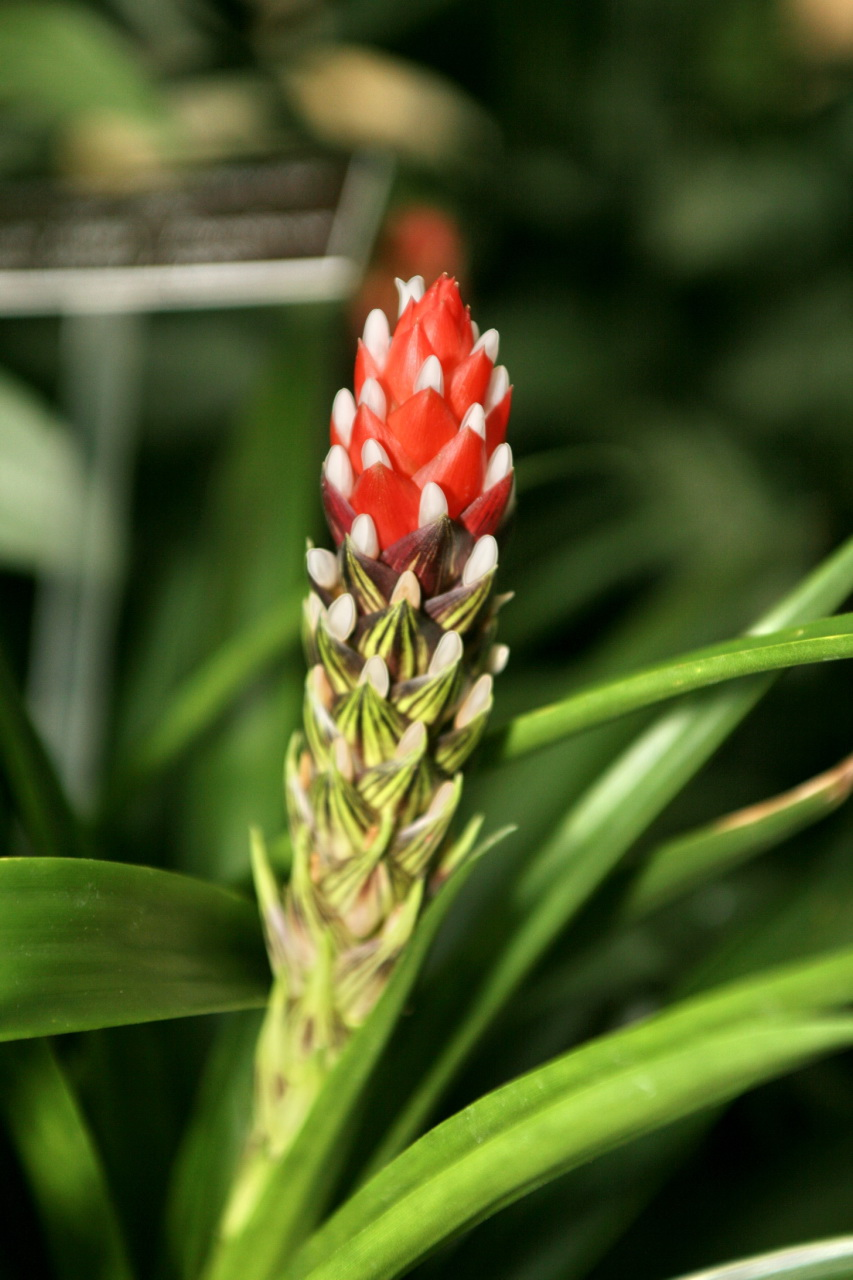

Conservation status
- Apparently Secure (NatureServe)

Scientific classification
- Kingdom: Plantae
- Clade: Tracheophytes
- Clade: Angiosperms
- Clade: Monocots
- Clade: Commelinids
- Order: Poales
- Family: Bromeliaceae
- Genus: Guzmania
- Species: G. monostachia

Binomial name
- Guzmania monostachia (Linnaeus) Rusby ex Mez

Synonyms
- Renealmia monostachia L.; Tillandsia monostachia (L.) L.; Tillandsia clavata Lam.; Pourretia sympaganthera Ruiz & Pav.; Guzmania tricolor Ruiz & Pav.; Guzmania comosa Bertero ex Schult. & Schult.f.; Guzmania sympaganthera (Ruiz & Pav.) Beer; Tillandsia comosa (Bertero ex Schult. & Schult.f.) Griseb.; Tillandsia pachycarpa Baker; Tillandsia gymnophylla Baker; Guzmania grandis Baker; Guzmania maculata Linden ex Baker; Guzmania platysepala Mez & C.F.Baker; Guzmania laxa Mez & Sodiro; Bromelia tricolor Sander; Guzmania clavata (Lam.) Urb.

= Guzmania monostachia =

Species of flowering plant

Guzmania monostachia is an epiphytic species in the genus Guzmania. Also known as a West Indian tufted airplant, this species is native to South America (Bolivia, Brazil, Colombia, Ecuador, Peru, Venezuela), Central America, the West Indies and Florida. The species is also reportedly naturalized in Hawaii.

Guzmania monostachia is notable as it is a facultative CAM species, converting from C3 photosynthesis to CAM under high light treatment or drought stress as a protective measure.

== Cultivars ==
- Guzmania 'Premier Amour'

== Gallery ==
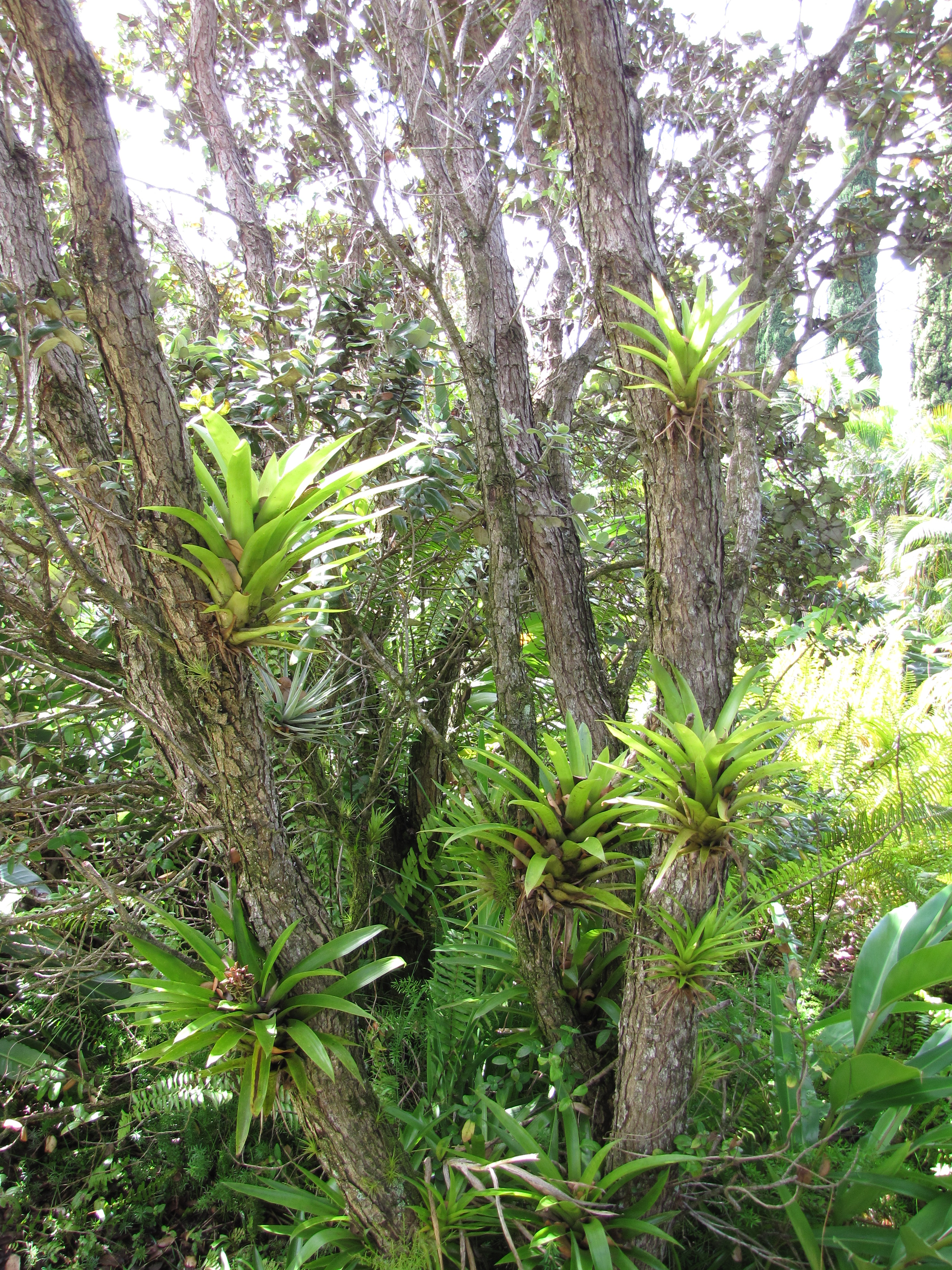
Guzmania monostachia growing at the Enchanting Floral Gardens of Kula, Maui.

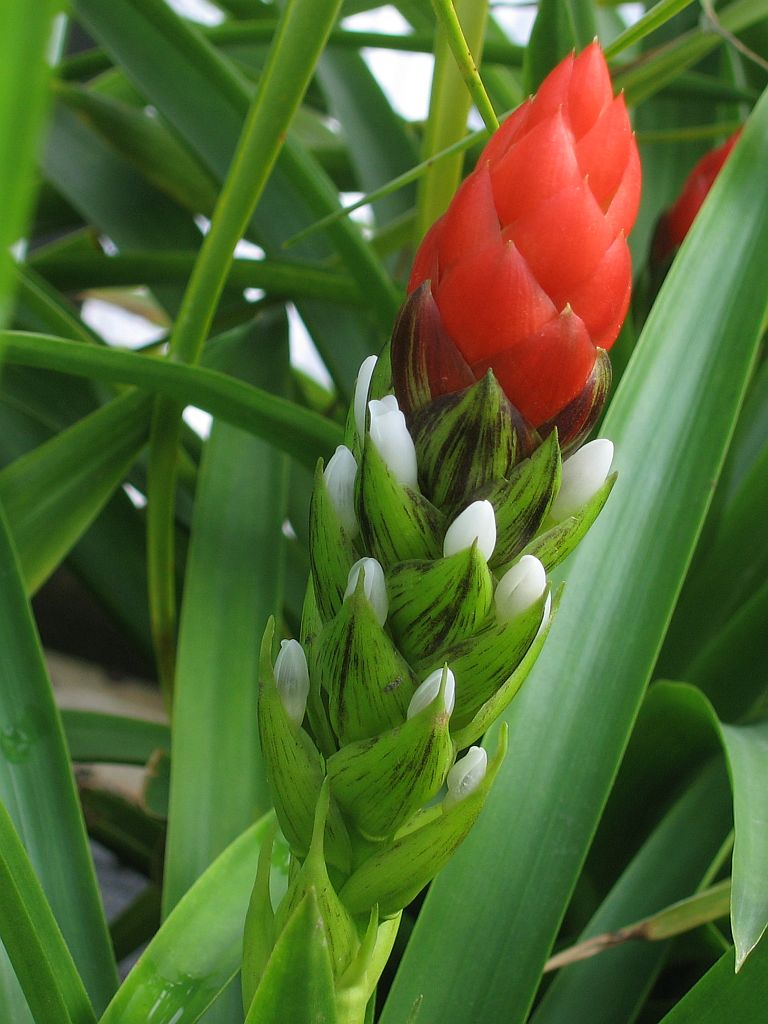
A close-up of the plant

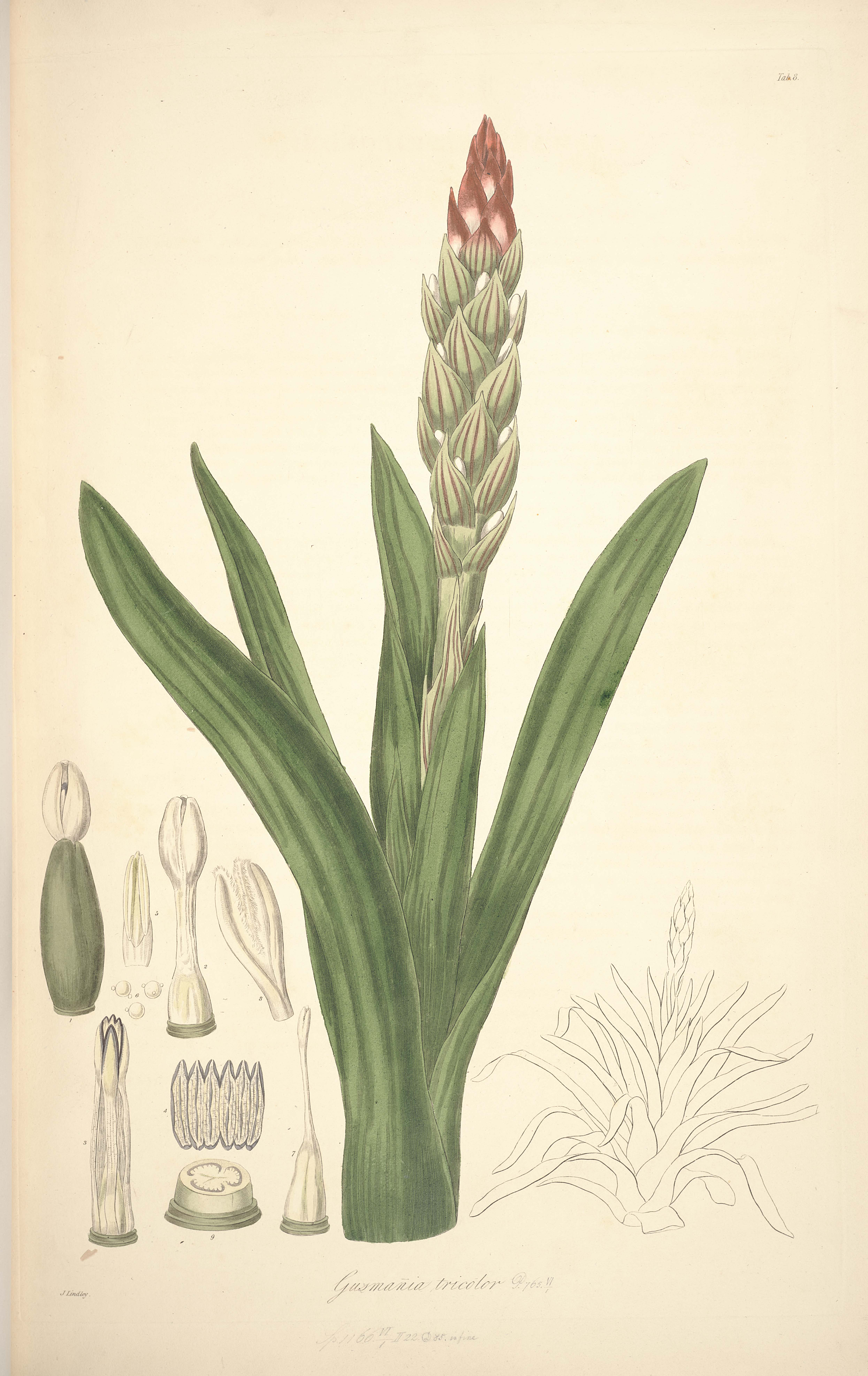
A drawing of the Guzmania monostachia from the "Collectanea botanica or Figures and botanic Illustrations of rare and curious exotic Plants" by John Lindley.
