= Kēōkea, Maui County, Hawaii =

Unincorporated community in Hawaii, United States

Kēōkea
- Census-designated place
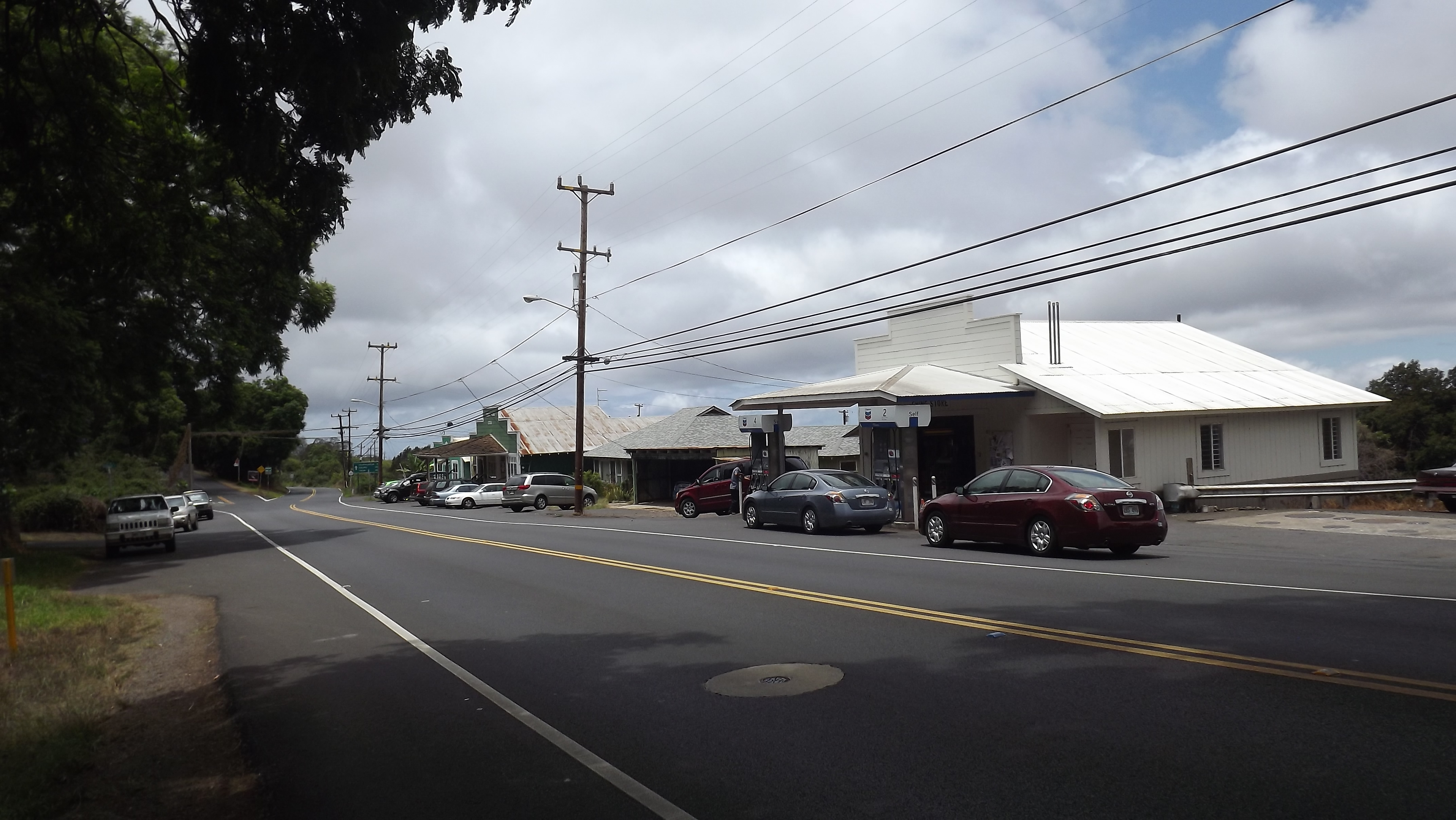
- Main area of Kēōkea

- Location in Hawaii
- Coordinates: 20°42′17″N 156°21′24″W
- Country: United States
- State: Hawaii
- County: Maui

Area
  - Total: 18.35 sq mi (47.5 km^{2})
  - Land: 18.35 sq mi (47.5 km^{2})
  - Water: 0.0 sq mi (0 km^{2})
- Elevation: 2,855 ft (870 m)

Population (2020)
  - Total: 2,199
  - Density: 119.9/sq mi (46.3/km^{2})
- Time zone: UTC−10 (Hawaii–Aleutian)
- ZIP code: 96790 (Kula)
- FIPS code: 15-36050
- GNIS feature ID: 2583419

Kēōkea (Hawaiian for 'the sound of white [caps]') is an unincorporated community, census-designated place (CDP), and Hawaiian home land on the island of Maui in Maui County, Hawaii, United States. It is situated on Hawaii State Highway 37 (the Kula Highway) at North Latitude 20.71 degrees, West Longitude 156.36 degrees. Its elevation is 2,860 feet (870 meters) above sea level. As of the 2020 census its population was 2,199, up from 1,612 in 2010.

Agriculture, forestry and ranching, which are supported by the area's fertile though often rocky volcanic loams, are important around this settlement, which has a temperate climate because of its elevation. Tourism also contributes to the local economy. The area around Kēōkea is characterized by a steep precipitation gradient: lowlands just 5 miles (8 km) to the northwest have mean annual precipitation of less than 16 inches (410 mm), while higher elevations 10 miles (16 km) to the northeast see 140 inches (3,600 mm). Kēōkea has a mean annual precipitation of about 32 inches (810 mm).

== Geography ==
Kēōkea is bordered to the north by the community of Kula, while to the southeast is the Kula Forest Preserve, ascending to 7,051-foot (2,149 m) Puʻukēōkea. Via Highway 37, Kahului is 21 miles (34 km) to the northwest.

According to the U.S. Census Bureau, the Kēōkea CDP has an area of 18.3 square miles (47 km^{2}), all land.

== Gallery ==
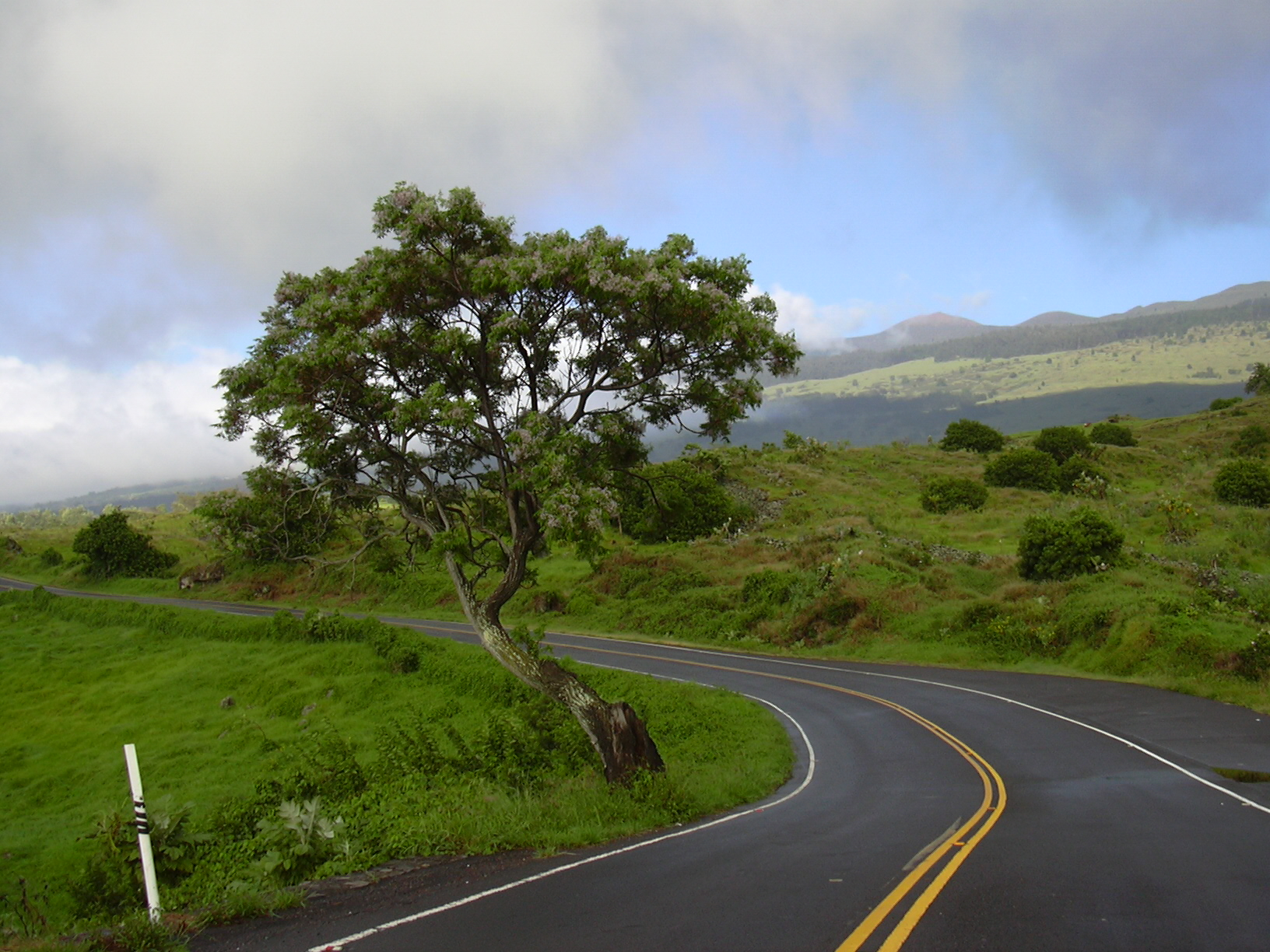
Kēōkea countryside with chinaberry tree

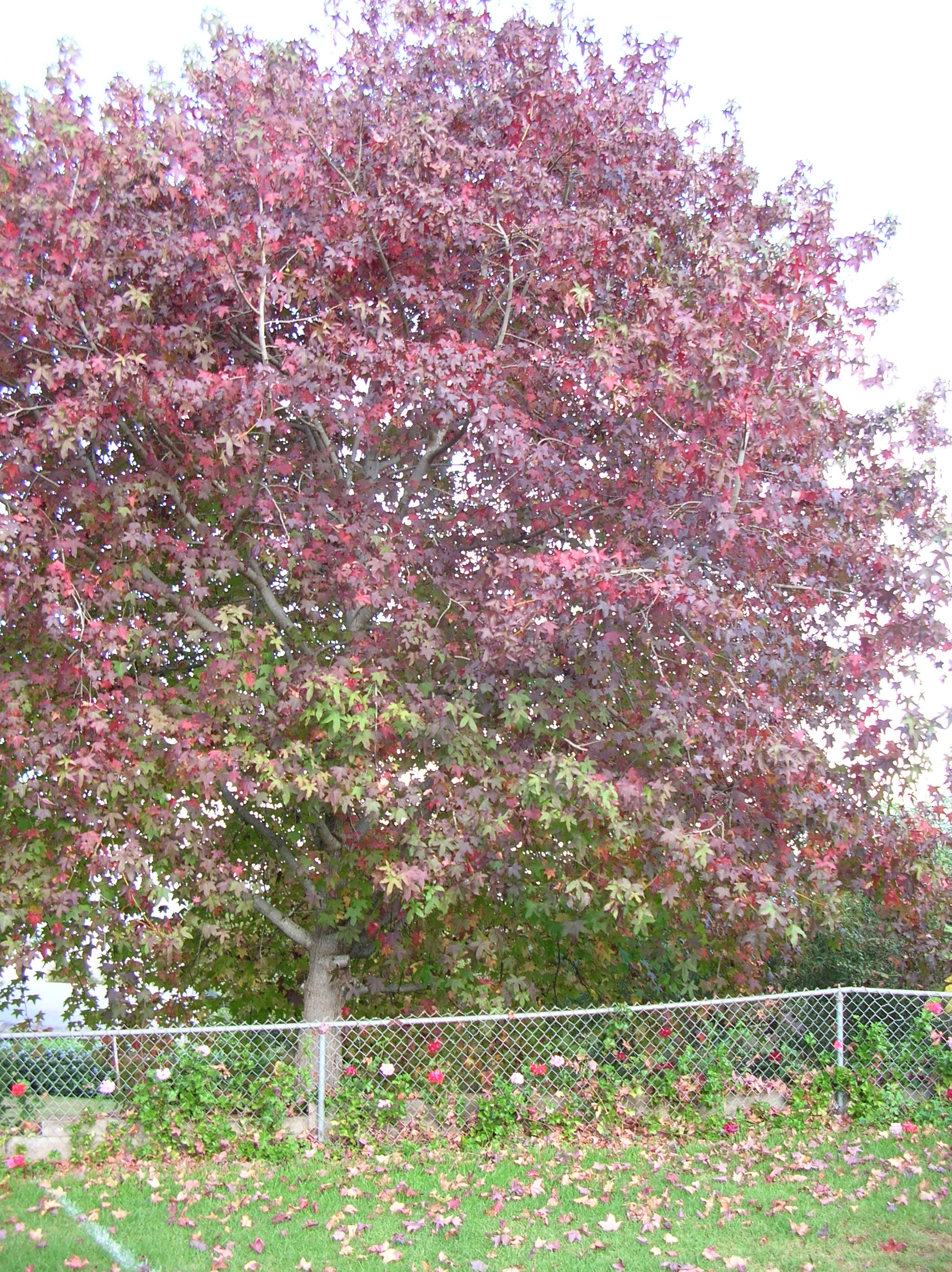
Kēōkea's elevation of 2,860 feet (870 meters) provides a climate which supports mid-latitude plant species and allows fall colors to develop on some of them, including this American sweetgum.

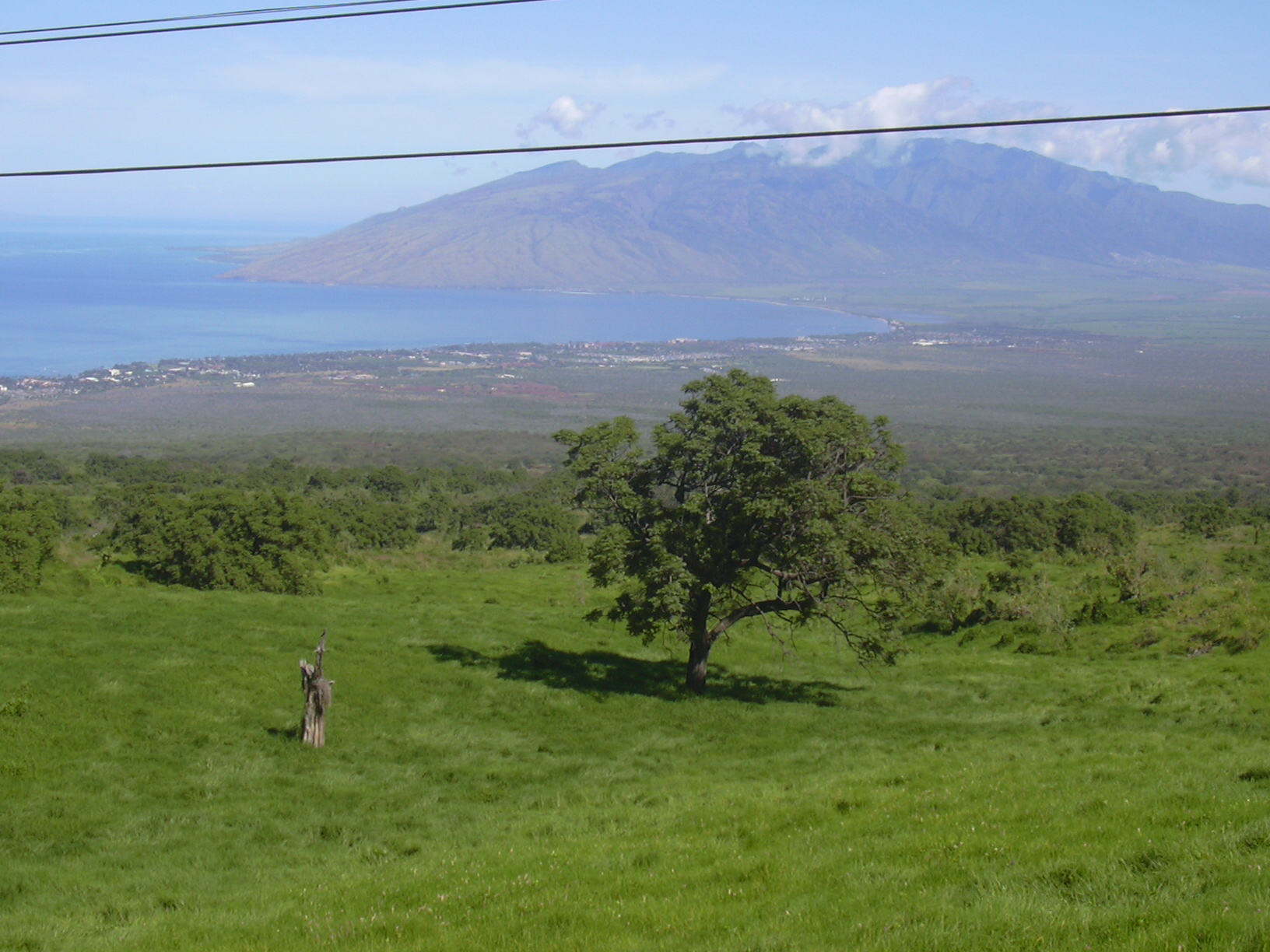
View from Kēōkea, looking northwest across Māʻalaea Bay
