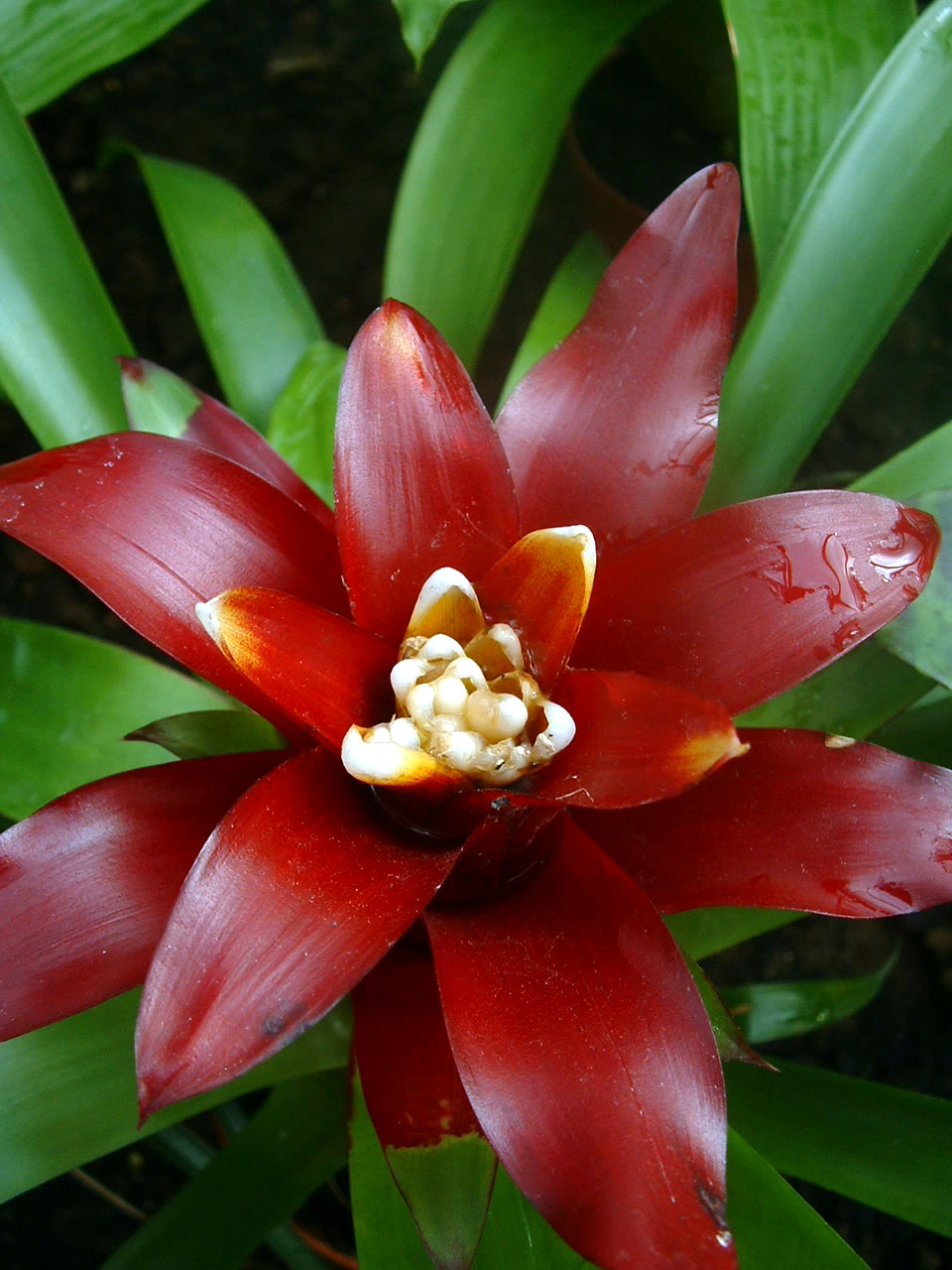

Scientific classification
- Kingdom: Plantae
- Clade: Tracheophytes
- Clade: Angiosperms
- Clade: Monocots
- Clade: Commelinids
- Order: Poales
- Family: Bromeliaceae
- Genus: Guzmania
- Species: G. lingulata

Binomial name
- Guzmania lingulata (L.) Mez

Synonyms
- Tillandsia lingulata L.; Caraguata lingulata (L.) Lindl.; Tillandsia clavata D.Dietr.; Guzmania cardinalis (André) Mez; Caraguata cardinalis André; Tillandsia sordida Salisb.; Caraguata latifolia Beer; Guzmania minor Mez; Caraguata splendens Planch.; Caraguata peacockii E.Morren; Guzmania peacockii (E.Morren) Mez

= Guzmania lingulata =

Species of flowering plant

Guzmania lingulata, the droophead tufted airplant or scarlet star, is a species of flowering plant in the family Bromeliaceae, subfamily Tillandsioideae. This evergreen epiphytic perennial is native to rainforest habitats in Central America, northern and central South America and southern Mexico. The Latin word lingulata means "tongue-shaped". The foliage grows in a star-shaped basal rosette culminating in an orange and red bracted inflorescence. It is among the most commonly cultivated bromeliad types, with cultivars producing flowers in shades of maroon, red, orange, yellow or pink.

== Varieties ==
Four varieties are recognized:

- Guzmania lingulata var. cardinalis (André) Mez – Colombia, Ecuador
- Guzmania lingulata var. concolor Proctor & Cedeño-Mald. – Central America, West Indies, northern and central South America (Guianas and Colombia south to Bolivia), southern Mexico
- Guzmania lingulata var. flammea (L.B.Sm.) L.B.Sm. – Colombia, Ecuador
- Guzmania lingulata var. lingulata – Guyana, Suriname, Jamaica, Venezuelan Antilles; naturalized in Bermuda
