= Omaopio =

Omaopio is a farming area on the slopes of the volcano Haleakala (or Hale Akala) on the island of Maui. The western side of Haleakala is commonly known as Kula, and ridges of land run up the slopes of the volcano. Omaopio refers to the ridge of land containing the road named Omaopio Road. It is north of the ridge of land commonly known as Pulehu.

Omaopio was originally settled by several Japanese families. It has been and still is a farming community with very rich soil. Traditional crops include the Kula onion (Granex), broccoli, beans, and cabbage. Recently, coffee (arabica) has been introduced. Traditional animals include goats, hogs and cattle. More recently the area has seen a large influx of horses, and commercial stables. Sugar cane fields bracketed the lower end of the road, but crop plantings were discontinued in 2016.
