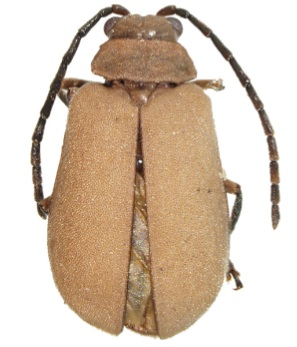

Scientific classification
- Kingdom: Animalia
- Phylum: Arthropoda
- Clade: Pancrustacea
- Class: Insecta
- Order: Coleoptera
- Suborder: Polyphaga
- Infraorder: Cucujiformia
- Family: Chrysomelidae
- Genus: Caraguata
- Species: C. pallida

Binomial name
- Caraguata pallida (Jacoby, 1886)

Synonyms
- Monocesta pallida Jacoby, 1886

= Caraguata pallida =

Species of beetle

Caraguata pallida is a species of beetle of the family Chrysomelidae. It is found in Nicaragua.
