= Holy Ghost Catholic Church (Kula, Hawaii) =

Historic church in Hawaii, United States

- U.S. National Register of Historic Places
- Hawaiʻi Register of Historic Places
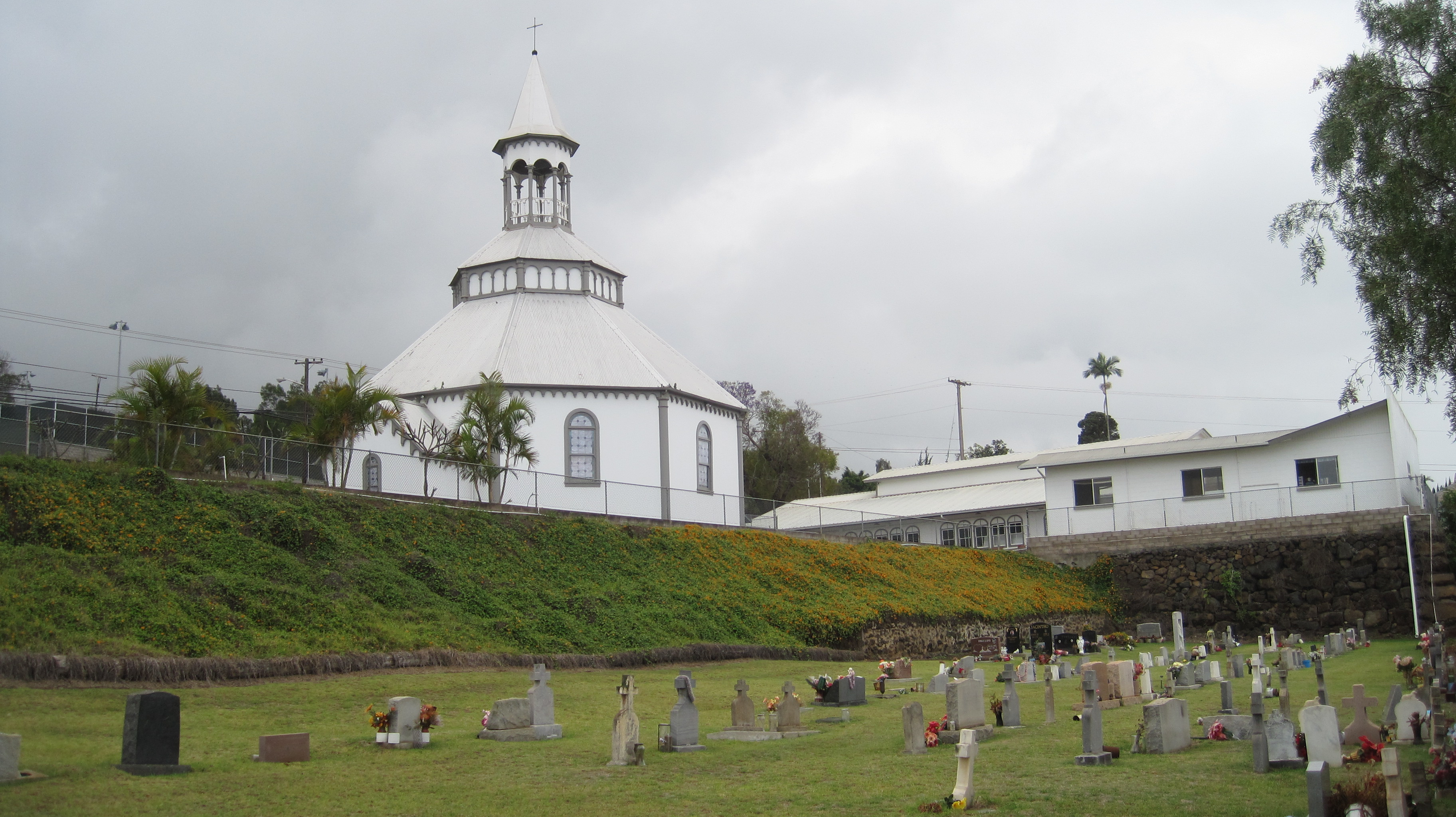
- Holy Ghost Roman Catholic Church in 2010

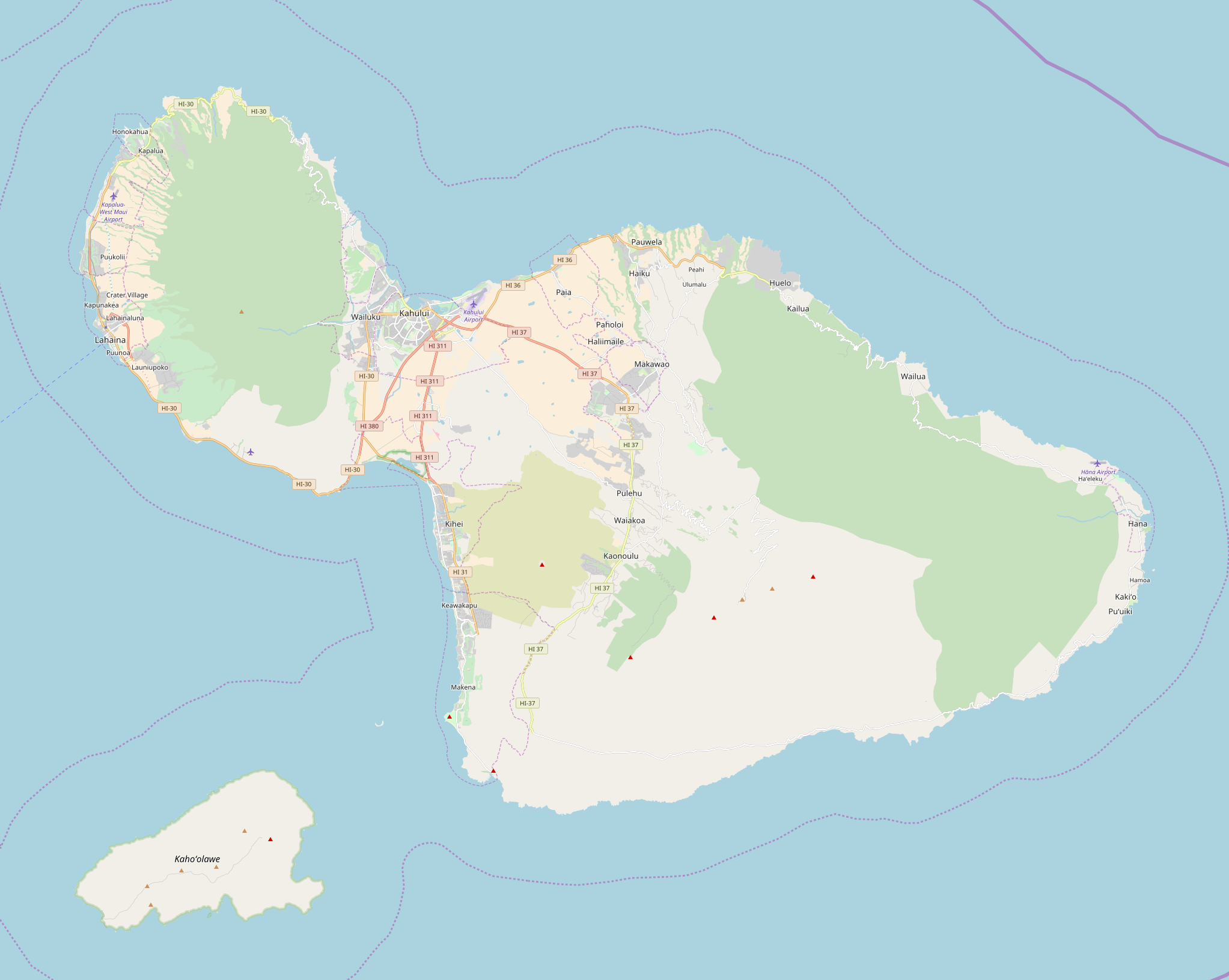
- Location within Maui Location within Hawaii
- Location: 4300 Lower Kula Road, Kula, Maui, Hawaii
- Coordinates: 20°45′46″N 156°19′37″W
- Area: 1.8 acres (0.73 ha)
- Built: 1894
- Architect: Father James Beissel
- Architectural style: Octagon mode
- NRHP reference No.: 83000255
- HRHP No.: 50-50-11-01553

Significant dates
- Added to NRHP: August 18, 1983
- Designated HRHP: August 18, 1983

Holy Ghost Catholic Church, also known as Holy Ghost Mission, is an historic octagon-shaped Roman Catholic church building on the island of Maui, located at 4300 Lower Kula Road in Waiakoa in the Kula district. It was designed by Father James Beissel and built by his parishioners who were Portuguese from the Azores and the Madeira Islands who had come to work on the local sugarcane plantation. The first mass was celebrated in it in 1895. It was consecrated in 1899 by Bishop Gulstan Ropert, the third vicar apostolic of the Vicariate Apostolic of the Sandwich Islands — now the Roman Catholic Diocese of Honolulu.

On April 29, 1983, it was placed on the Hawaii Register of Historic Places and on August 18, 1983, it was placed on the National Register of Historic Places. It may be the only historic octagonal building in Hawaii.

In 1991 the building was closed for a year in order to undergo a major restoration. Holy Ghost Mission is still an active Roman Catholic congregation, which annually at Pentecost celebrates the Portuguese Holy Ghost Festival.

== Gallery ==
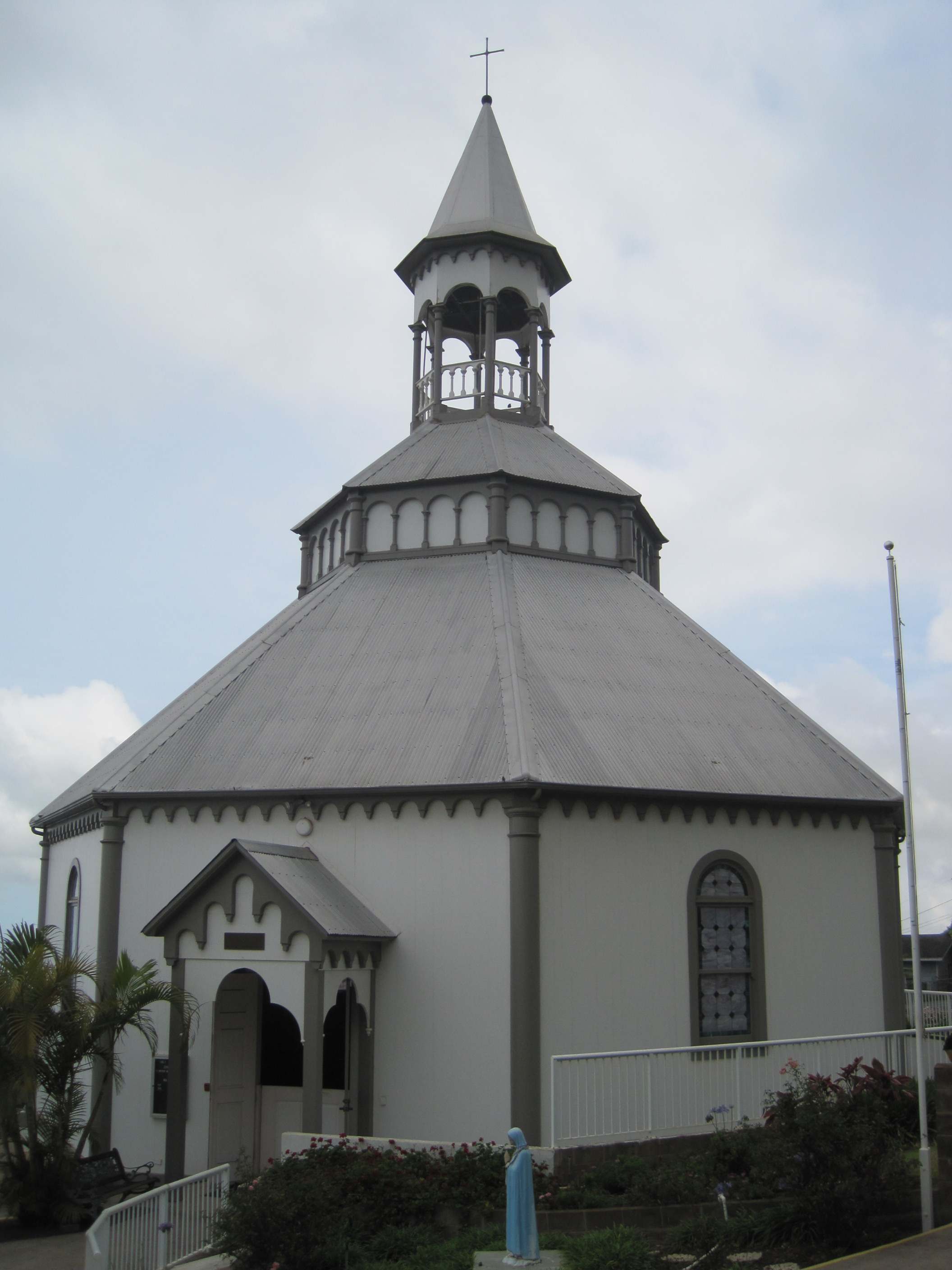
Front entrance

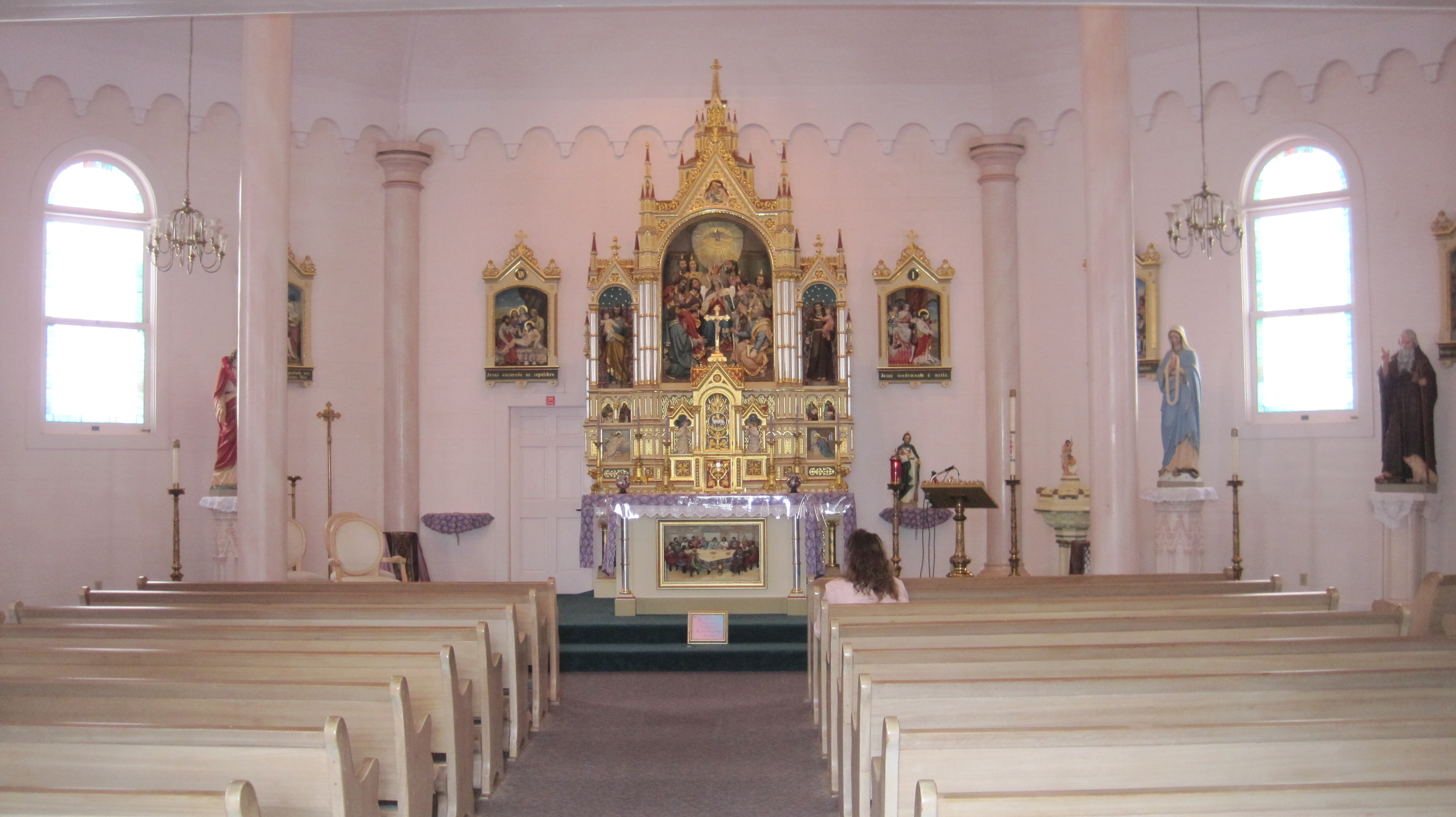
Altar

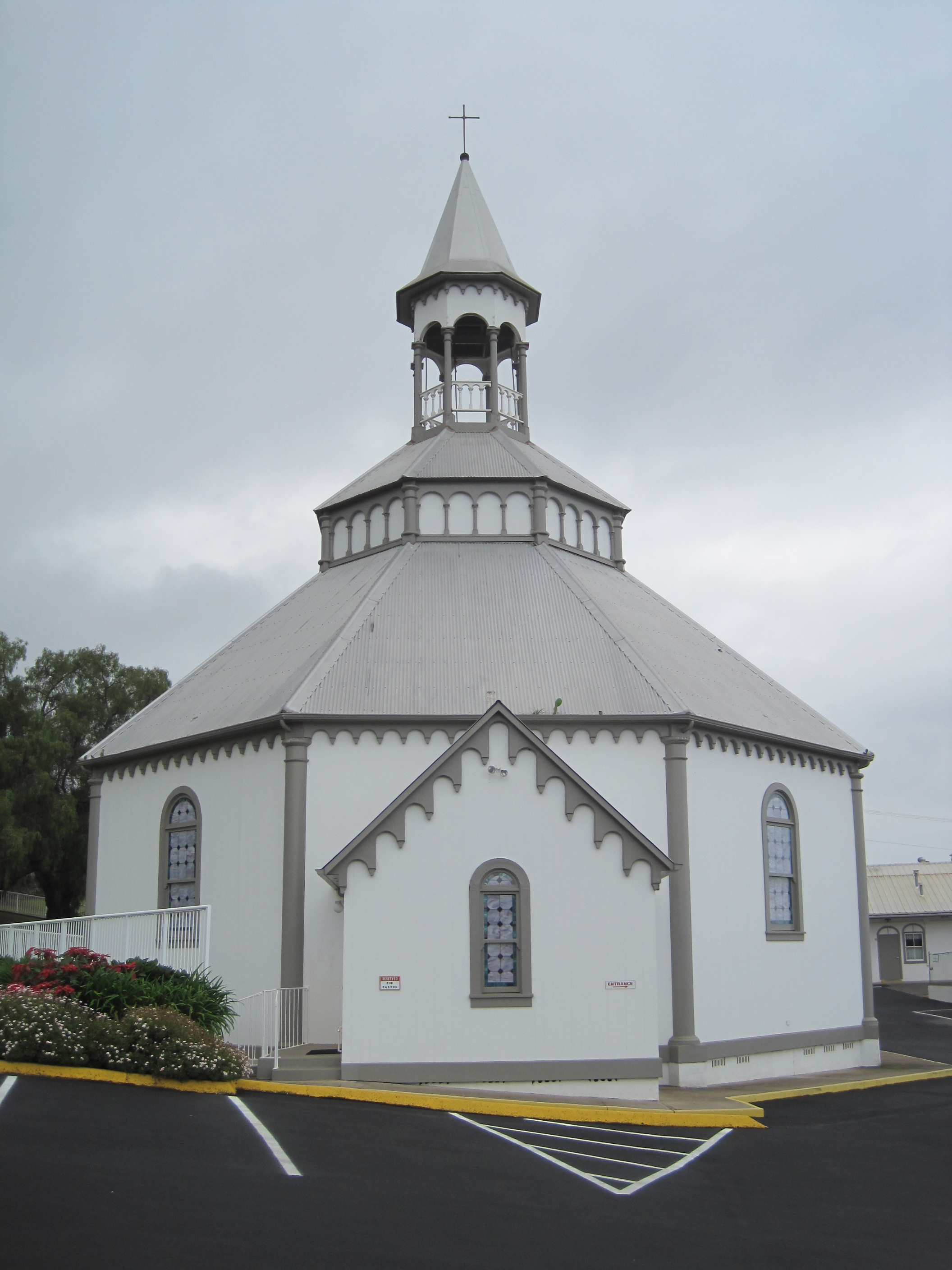
Rear view

== See also ==
- List of Registered Historic Places in Hawaii
