= Caraguata (beetle) =

Scientific classification
- Kingdom: Animalia
- Phylum: Arthropoda
- Clade: Pancrustacea
- Class: Insecta
- Order: Coleoptera
- Suborder: Polyphaga
- Infraorder: Cucujiformia
- Family: Chrysomelidae
- Subfamily: Galerucinae
- Tribe: Galerucini
- Genus: Caraguata; Bechyné, 1954

Genus of leaf beetles

Caraguata is a genus of beetles belonging to the family Chrysomelidae.

== Species ==
- Caraguata angulicollis
- Caraguata apleurica
- Caraguata approximata
- Caraguata atricornis
- Caraguata bella
- Caraguata brasiliensis
- Caraguata circumcincta
- Caraguata crassicornis
- Caraguata discoidalis
- Caraguata fiebrigi
- Caraguata flavocincta
- Caraguata fuscescens
- Caraguata guaporensis
- Caraguata hebes
- Caraguata mantiqueira
- Caraguata nigricornis
- Caraguata nigroviridis
- Caraguata olivina
- Caraguata ovalis
- Caraguata pallida
- Caraguata pallidicornis
- Caraguata punctifrons
- Caraguata rodina
- Caraguata romani
- Caraguata sanguinicollis
- Caraguata sublimbata
- Caraguata subvittata
- Caraguata tarsalis
- Caraguata trinidadensis
- Caraguata trochanterica
