= Enchanted Floral Gardens of Kula, Maui =

Botanical garden in Kula on the island of Maui, Hawaii

Coordinates: 20.7922°N 156.3270°W

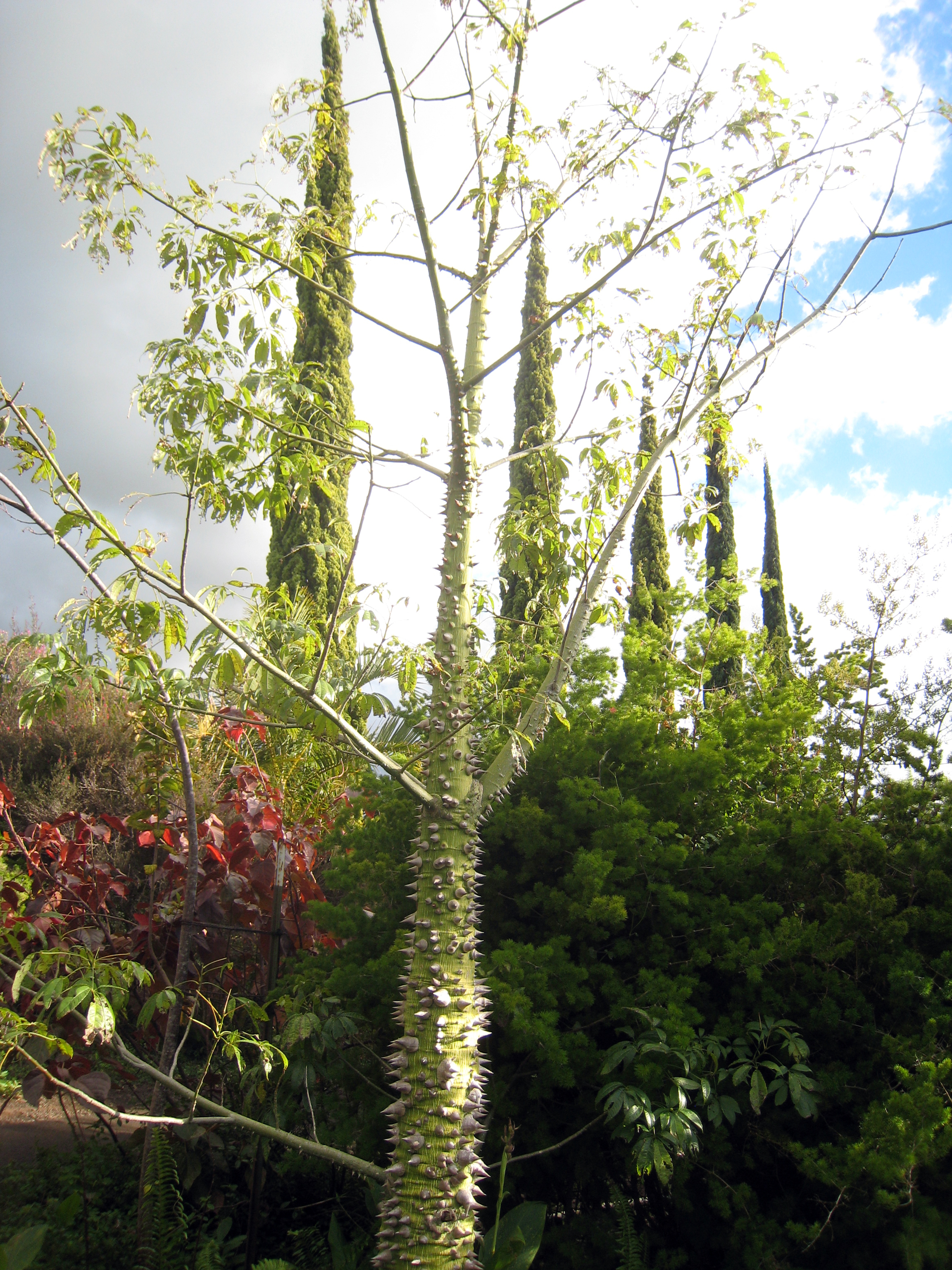
Enchanting Floral Gardens — of Kula, Maui.

The Enchanted Floral Gardens of Kula, Maui is a botanical garden located in Kula, on the island of Maui, Hawaii. The 8 acres (3.2 ha) garden is in the mountains, at 2,500 feet (760 m) above sea level.

The gardens contain over 2,000 species of subtropical and tropical plants from around the world. The collection has an emphasis on fruit trees and flowering plants, including hibiscus, orchids, and proteas.

The Enchanted Floral Gardens are open daily Tuesday through Sunday, 9 am to 5 pm, with an admission fee. They are located at 2505 Kula Highway, mile marker 10,(Highway 37), in Kula.

Formerly known as the Enchanting Floral Gardens, it was closed for four years, reopening in 2017.

== See also ==
- List of botanical gardens in the United States
