= Māʻalaea Bay =

Bay in Hawaii, United States

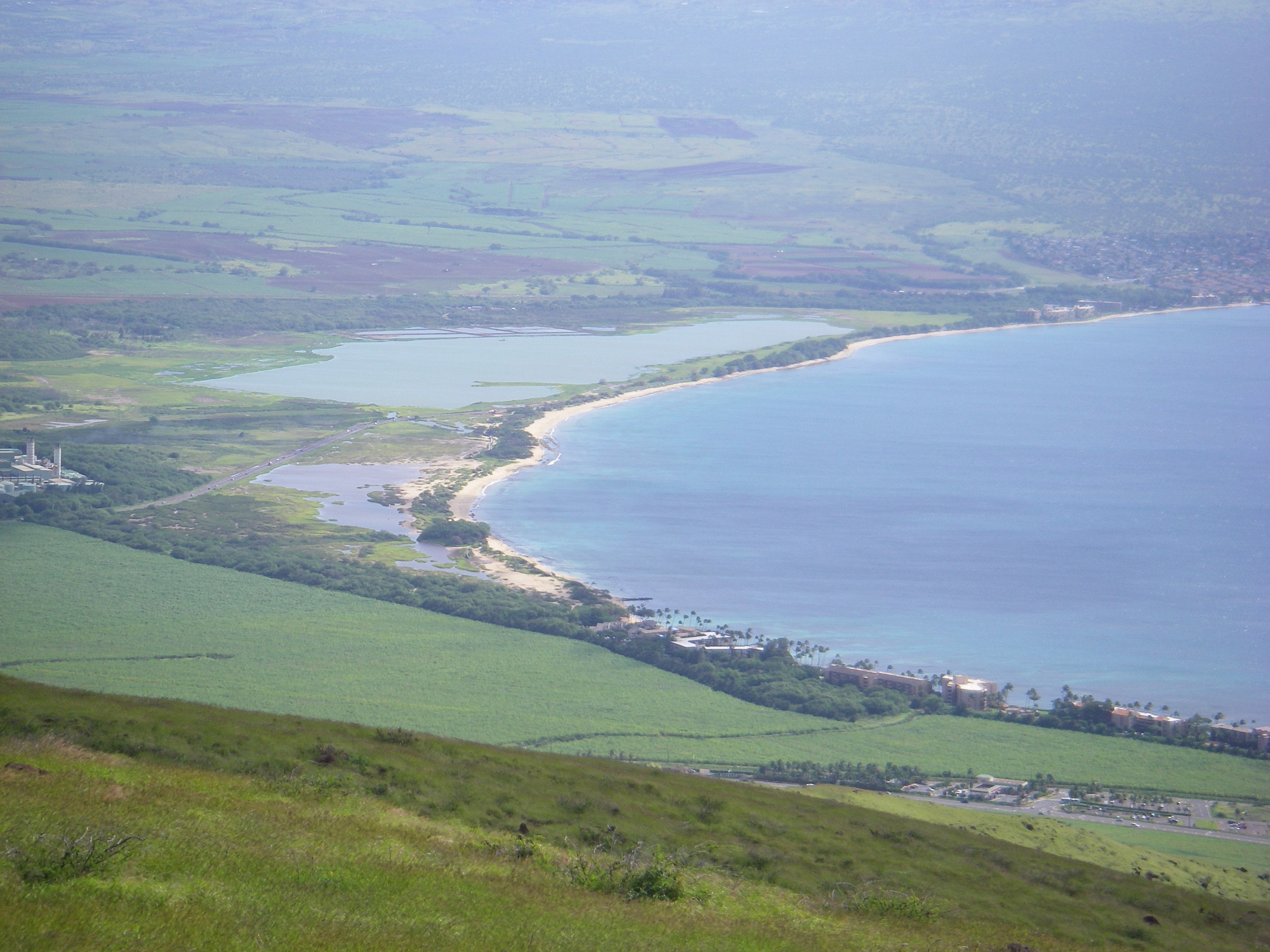
Ma'alaea Bay as viewed from the West Maui Mountains, 2009

Māʻalaea Bay (20°46′45″N 156°29′26″W) is a large bay in the southwestern coast of Maui, in the Hawaiian islands. Several small towns are located close to the bay, notably the town of Māʻalaea. The bay is approximately three miles (4.8 km) long.

The famous surf break known as “Freight Trains” crosses Māʻalaea Bay on Maui’s southern shore. Large waves, or swells, are typically generated in the southern hemisphere during winter, when large storms brew in the southern Pacific Ocean. These are some of the largest—rideable and accessible—waves on the planet.
