= Vriesea sulcata =

Scientific classification
- Kingdom: Plantae
- Clade: Tracheophytes
- Clade: Angiosperms
- Clade: Monocots
- Clade: Commelinids
- Order: Poales
- Family: Bromeliaceae
- Genus: Vriesea
- Species: V. sulcata

Binomial name
- Vriesea sulcata L.B.Smith

Species of flowering plant

Vriesea sulcata is a plant species in the family Bromeliaceae. This species is endemic to Venezuela.
