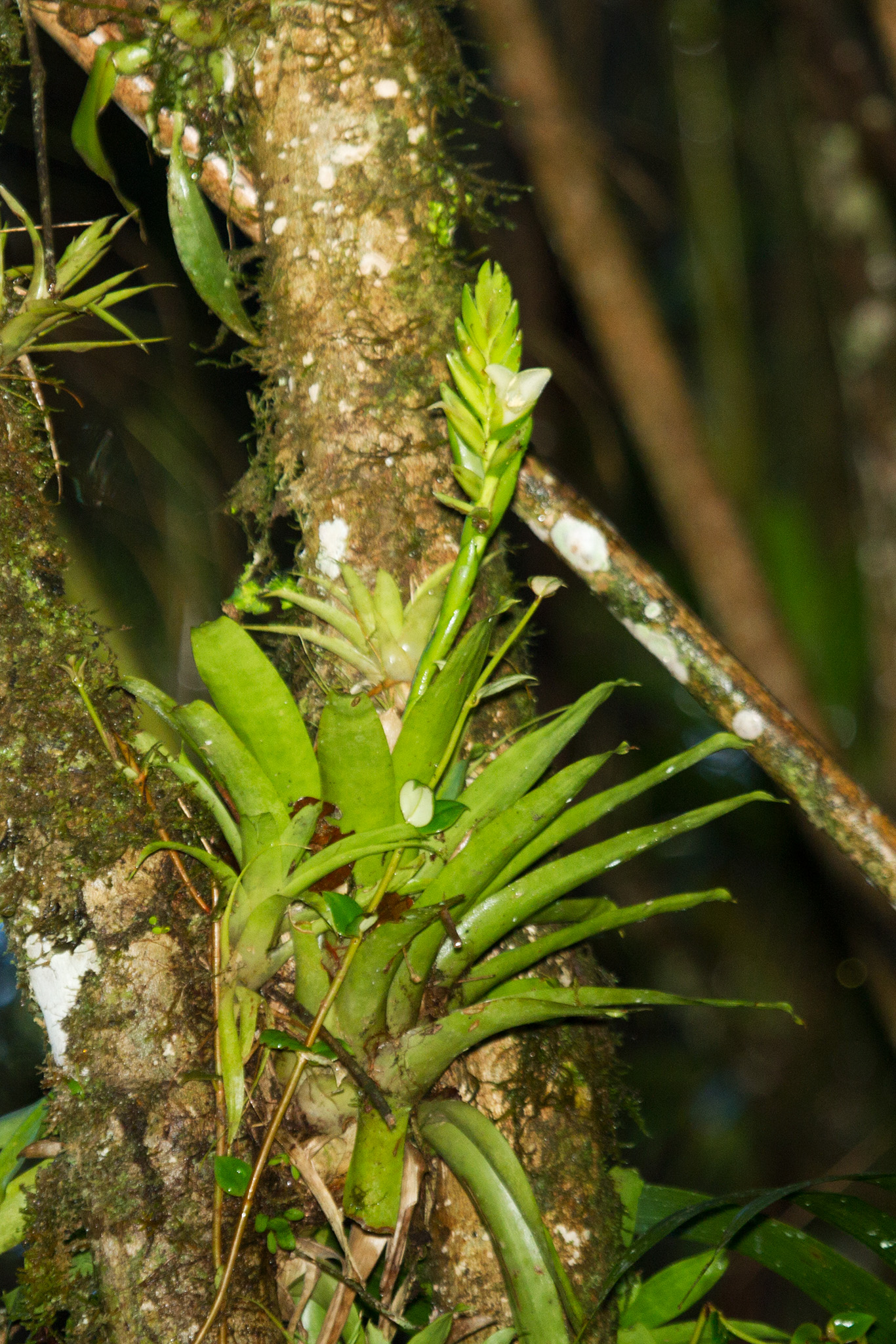

Scientific classification
- Kingdom: Plantae
- Clade: Embryophytes
- Clade: Tracheophytes
- Clade: Spermatophytes
- Clade: Angiosperms
- Clade: Monocots
- Clade: Commelinids
- Order: Poales
- Family: Bromeliaceae
- Genus: Vriesea
- Species: V. unilateralis

Binomial name
- Vriesea unilateralis (Baker) Mez

Synonyms
- Tillandsia unilateralis Baker

= Vriesea unilateralis =

Species of plant

Vriesea unilateralis is a species of flowering plant in the family Bromeliaceae. It is endemic to Brazil (Paraná, Santa Catarina, Espírito Santo, Rio de Janeiro and São Paulo States). The specific epithet, unilateralis, is derived from Latin and means "one-sided".
