= Vriesea sucrei =

Scientific classification
- Kingdom: Plantae
- Clade: Embryophytes
- Clade: Tracheophytes
- Clade: Spermatophytes
- Clade: Angiosperms
- Clade: Monocots
- Clade: Commelinids
- Order: Poales
- Family: Bromeliaceae
- Genus: Vriesea
- Species: V. sucrei

Binomial name
- Vriesea sucrei L.B.Smith & R.W.Read

Species of flowering plant

Vriesea sucrei is a plant species in the genus Vriesea.

The bromeliad is endemic to the Atlantic Forest biome (Mata Atlantica Brasileira), located in southeastern Brazil.

== Cultivars ==
- Vriesea 'Coppertone'
- Vriesea 'Pink Gusher'
- Vriesea 'Regent'
- Vriesea 'Sunset'
- Vriesea 'Sweet One'
- Vriesea 'Sweet Red'
- Vriesea 'Sweet Yellow'
- Vriesea 'Yara'
