= Vriesea zamorensis =

Scientific classification
- Kingdom: Plantae
- Clade: Tracheophytes
- Clade: Angiosperms
- Clade: Monocots
- Clade: Commelinids
- Order: Poales
- Family: Bromeliaceae
- Genus: Vriesea
- Species: V. zamorensis

Binomial name
- Vriesea zamorensis (L.B.Smith) L.B.Smith

Species of flowering plant

Vriesea zamorensis is a plant species in the genus Vriesea. This species is endemic to Ecuador.

== Cultivars ==
- Vriesea 'Elan'
- Vriesea 'Grande'

== Bibliography ==
- Luther, H.E. (1999). "Bromeliaceae". In Jørgensen, P.M.; León-Yánez, S. (eds.). Catalogue of the vascular plants of Ecuador = Catálogo de las plantas vasculares del Ecuador (PDF). St. Louis, Mo.: Missouri Botanical Garden Press. pp. 337–361. ISBN 978-0915279609. Archived from the original (PDF) on 26 September 2006.
- BSI Cultivar Registry Retrieved 11 October 2009
