= Vriesea gradata =

Scientific classification
- Kingdom: Plantae
- Clade: Tracheophytes
- Clade: Angiosperms
- Clade: Monocots
- Clade: Commelinids
- Order: Poales
- Family: Bromeliaceae
- Genus: Vriesea
- Species: V. gradata

Binomial name
- Vriesea gradata (Baker) Mez

Synonyms
- Tillandsia gradata Baker

Species of plant

Vriesea gradata is a species of flowering plant in the Bromeliaceae family. This species is endemic to Brazil.

== Cultivars ==
- Vriesea 'Bobalou'
- Vriesea 'Coppertone'
- Vriesea 'Kelly Anne'
- Vriesea 'Phillip'
