= Vriesea rubra =

Scientific classification
- Kingdom: Plantae
- Clade: Tracheophytes
- Clade: Angiosperms
- Clade: Monocots
- Clade: Commelinids
- Order: Poales
- Family: Bromeliaceae
- Genus: Vriesea
- Species: V. rubra

Binomial name
- Vriesea rubra (Ruiz & Pavón) Beer

Synonyms
- Tillandsia rubra Ruiz & Pav.; Phytarrhiza rubra (Ruiz & Pav.) E.Morren ex Baker; Vriesea albiflora Ule; Tillandsia rhododactyla Mez

Species of epiphyte

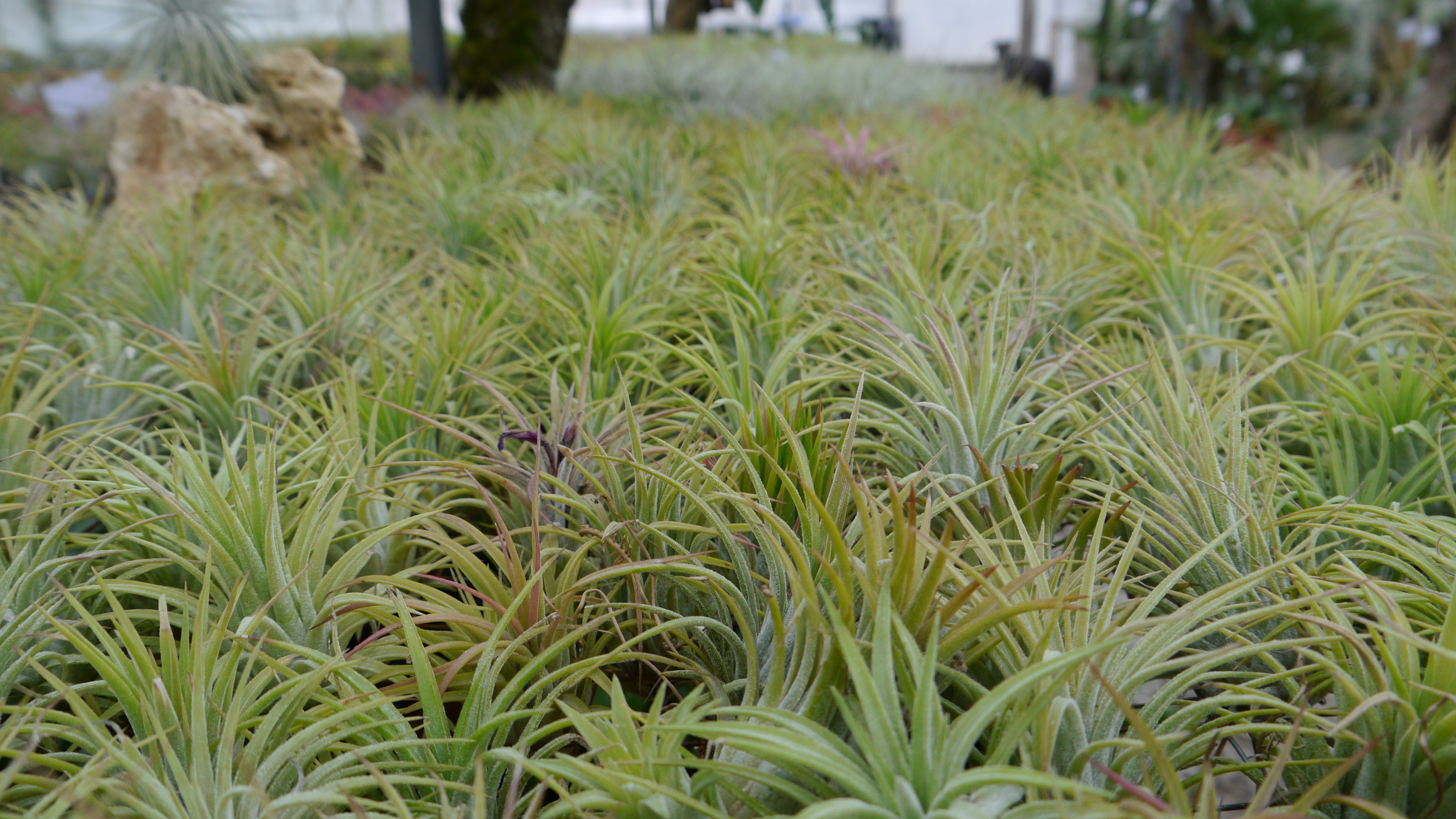
Tillandsia rubra (Vriesea rubra) air plants in a UK air plant nursery

Vriesea rubra is a plant species in the genus Vriesea. This species is native to Trinidad and northern South America (Colombia, Ecuador, Peru, Guyana, northern Brazil, and Venezuela).
