= Vriesea fibrosa =

Scientific classification
- Kingdom: Plantae
- Clade: Tracheophytes
- Clade: Angiosperms
- Clade: Monocots
- Clade: Commelinids
- Order: Poales
- Family: Bromeliaceae
- Genus: Vriesea
- Species: V. fibrosa

Binomial name
- Vriesea fibrosa L.B.Smith

Species of epiphyte

Vriesea fibrosa is a plant species in the genus Vriesea. This species is native to the State of Amazonas in southern Venezuela.
