= Vriesea duidae =

Scientific classification
- Kingdom: Plantae
- Clade: Tracheophytes
- Clade: Angiosperms
- Clade: Monocots
- Clade: Commelinids
- Order: Poales
- Family: Bromeliaceae
- Genus: Vriesea
- Species: V. duidae

Binomial name
- Vriesea duidae (L.B. Smith) Gouda

Synonyms
- Tillandsia duidae L.B.Sm

Species of epiphytic plant

Vriesea duidae is a plant species in the genus Vriesea. This species is native to Venezuela and Guyana.
