= Vriesea pauciflora =

Scientific classification
- Kingdom: Plantae
- Clade: Embryophytes
- Clade: Tracheophytes
- Clade: Spermatophytes
- Clade: Angiosperms
- Clade: Monocots
- Clade: Commelinids
- Order: Poales
- Family: Bromeliaceae
- Genus: Vriesea
- Species: V. pauciflora

Binomial name
- Vriesea pauciflora Mez

Species of flowering plant

Vriesea pauciflora is a species of flowering plant in the family Bromeliaceae. This species is endemic to Brazil.

== Etymology ==
The specific epithet pauciflora is Latin for 'few-flowered'.
