= Vriesea goniorachis =

Scientific classification
- Kingdom: Plantae
- Clade: Tracheophytes
- Clade: Angiosperms
- Clade: Monocots
- Clade: Commelinids
- Order: Poales
- Family: Bromeliaceae
- Genus: Vriesea
- Species: V. goniorachis

Binomial name
- Vriesea goniorachis (Baker) Mez

Species of flowering plant

Vriesea goniorachis is a plant species in the genus Vriesea. This species is endemic to Brazil.
