= Vriesea zonata =

Scientific classification
- Kingdom: Plantae
- Clade: Tracheophytes
- Clade: Angiosperms
- Clade: Monocots
- Clade: Commelinids
- Order: Poales
- Family: Bromeliaceae
- Genus: Vriesea
- Species: V. zonata

Binomial name
- Vriesea zonata Leme & J.A.Siqueira

Species of flowering plant

Vriesea zonata is a plant species in the genus Vriesea, endemic to Brazil.
