= Vriesea vellozicola =

Scientific classification
- Kingdom: Plantae
- Clade: Tracheophytes
- Clade: Angiosperms
- Clade: Monocots
- Clade: Commelinids
- Order: Poales
- Family: Bromeliaceae
- Genus: Vriesea
- Species: V. vellozicola

Binomial name
- Vriesea vellozicola Leme & J.A.Siqueira

Species of flowering plant

Vriesea vellozicola is a plant species in the genus Vriesea. This species is endemic to Brazil.
