= Vriesea dubia =

Scientific classification
- Kingdom: Plantae
- Clade: Tracheophytes
- Clade: Angiosperms
- Clade: Monocots
- Clade: Commelinids
- Order: Poales
- Family: Bromeliaceae
- Genus: Vriesea
- Species: V. dubia

Binomial name
- Vriesea dubia (L.B. Smith) L.B. Smith

Synonyms
- Tillandsia dubia L.B.Sm; Vriesea alborubrobracteata Rauh

Species of epiphyte

Vriesea dubia is a plant species in the genus Vriesea. This species is native to Peru, Colombia, and Ecuador.

== Cultivars ==
- Vriesea 'Elan'
