= Vriesea costae =

Scientific classification
- Kingdom: Plantae
- Clade: Tracheophytes
- Clade: Angiosperms
- Clade: Monocots
- Clade: Commelinids
- Order: Poales
- Family: Bromeliaceae
- Genus: Vriesea
- Species: V. costae

Binomial name
- Vriesea costae B.R.Silva & Leme

Species of flowering plant

Vriesea costae is a plant species of bromeliad in the genus Vriesea. This species is endemic to Brazil.
