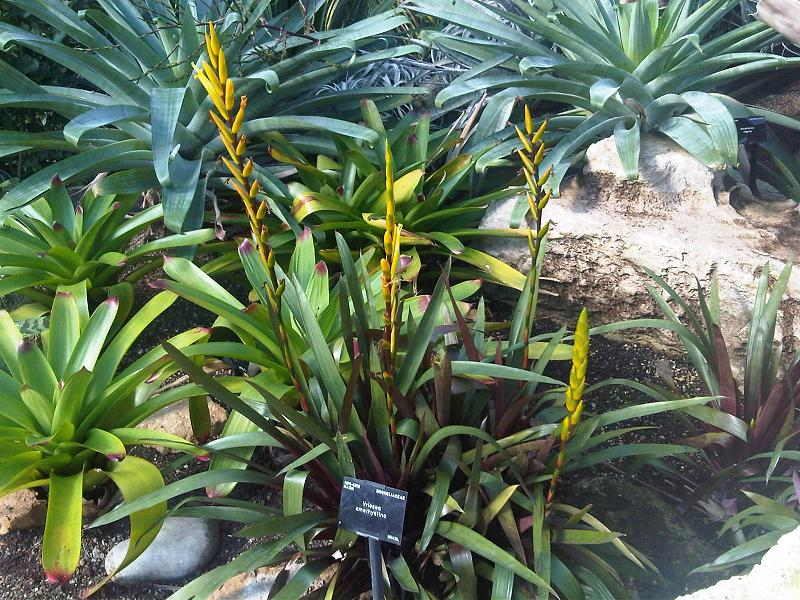

Scientific classification
- Kingdom: Plantae
- Clade: Tracheophytes
- Clade: Angiosperms
- Clade: Monocots
- Clade: Commelinids
- Order: Poales
- Family: Bromeliaceae
- Genus: Vriesea
- Species: V. amethystina

Binomial name
- Vriesea amethystina E.Morren

Synonyms
- Tillandsia amethystina (E.Morren) Baker

= Vriesea amethystina =

Species of plant

Vriesea amethystina is a species of tropical epiphyte of the genus Vriesea. It is endemic to southeastern Brazil, known from the States of Espírito Santo and Rio de Janeiro.

== Cultivars ==
- Vriesea 'Crousseana'
- Vriesea 'Gracilis'
- Vriesea 'Warmingii Minor'
