= Vriesea michaelii =

Scientific classification
- Kingdom: Plantae
- Clade: Tracheophytes
- Clade: Angiosperms
- Clade: Monocots
- Clade: Commelinids
- Order: Poales
- Family: Bromeliaceae
- Genus: Vriesea
- Species: V. michaelii

Binomial name
- Vriesea michaelii W. Weber

Species of epiphyte

Vriesea michaelii is a plant species in the genus Vriesea. This species is an epiphyte native to Brazil but probably extinct in the wild.
