= Vriesea altomacaensis =

Scientific classification
- Kingdom: Plantae
- Clade: Tracheophytes
- Clade: Angiosperms
- Clade: Monocots
- Clade: Commelinids
- Order: Poales
- Family: Bromeliaceae
- Genus: Vriesea
- Species: V. altomacaensis

Binomial name
- Vriesea altomacaensis A.Costa

Species of flowering plant

Vriesea altomacaensis is a plant species in the genus Vriesea. This species is endemic to Brazil. It is a perennial and grows primarily in the wet tropical biome.
