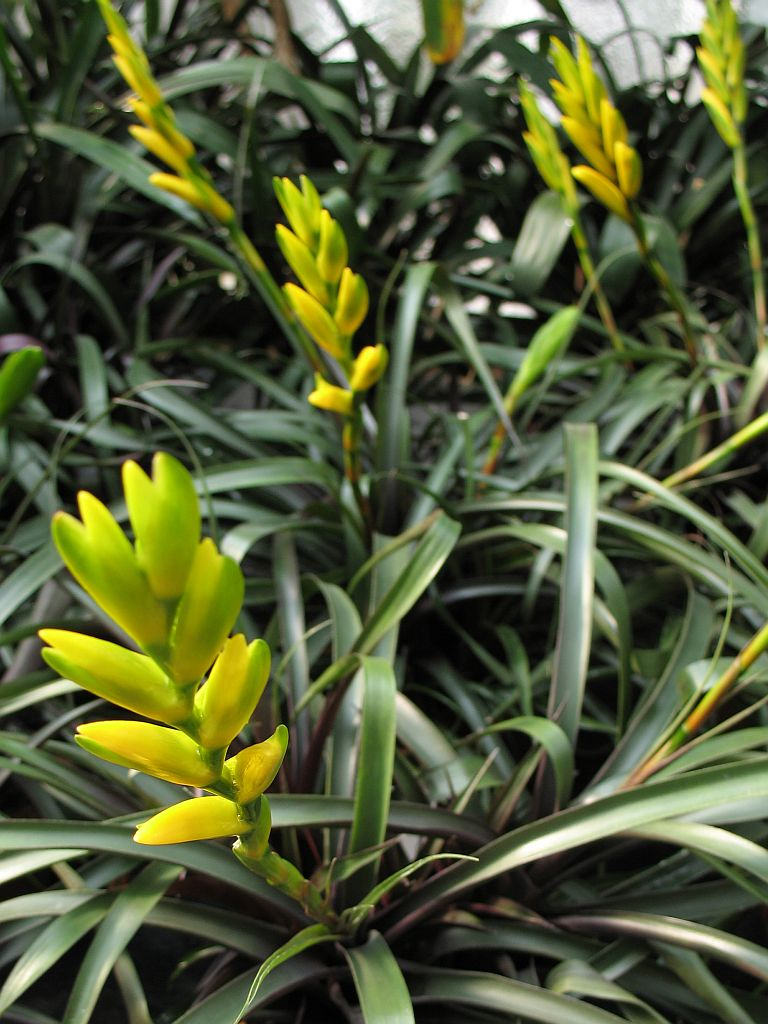

Scientific classification
- Kingdom: Plantae
- Clade: Tracheophytes
- Clade: Angiosperms
- Clade: Monocots
- Clade: Commelinids
- Order: Poales
- Family: Bromeliaceae
- Genus: Vriesea
- Species: V. bleheri

Binomial name
- Vriesea bleheri Roeth & W.Weber

= Vriesea bleheri =

Species of flowering plant

Vriesea bleheri is a plant species in the genus Vriesea. This species is endemic to Brazil. The name is sometimes spelled Vriesea bleherae.

== Cultivars ==
Cultivars include:

- Vriesea 'Elvira'
- Vriesea 'Nissa'
- Vriesea 'Purple Delight'
- Vriesea 'Serenity Gold'
- Vriesea 'Serenity Orange'
- Vriesea 'Serenity Red'
- Vriesea 'Tropical Princess'
