= Vriesea delicatula =

Scientific classification
- Kingdom: Plantae
- Clade: Embryophytes
- Clade: Tracheophytes
- Clade: Angiosperms
- Clade: Monocots
- Clade: Commelinids
- Order: Poales
- Family: Bromeliaceae
- Genus: Vriesea
- Species: V. delicatula

Binomial name
- Vriesea delicatula L.B. Smith

Species of flowering plant

Vriesea delicatula is a plant species in the genus Vriesea. This species is endemic to Brazil.

== Cultivars ==
- Vriesea 'Gold Splash'
- Vriesea 'Golden Wings'
- Vriesea 'Goldilocks'
- Vriesea 'Red Wings'
- Vriesea 'Starburst'
- Vriesea 'Tropic Night'
