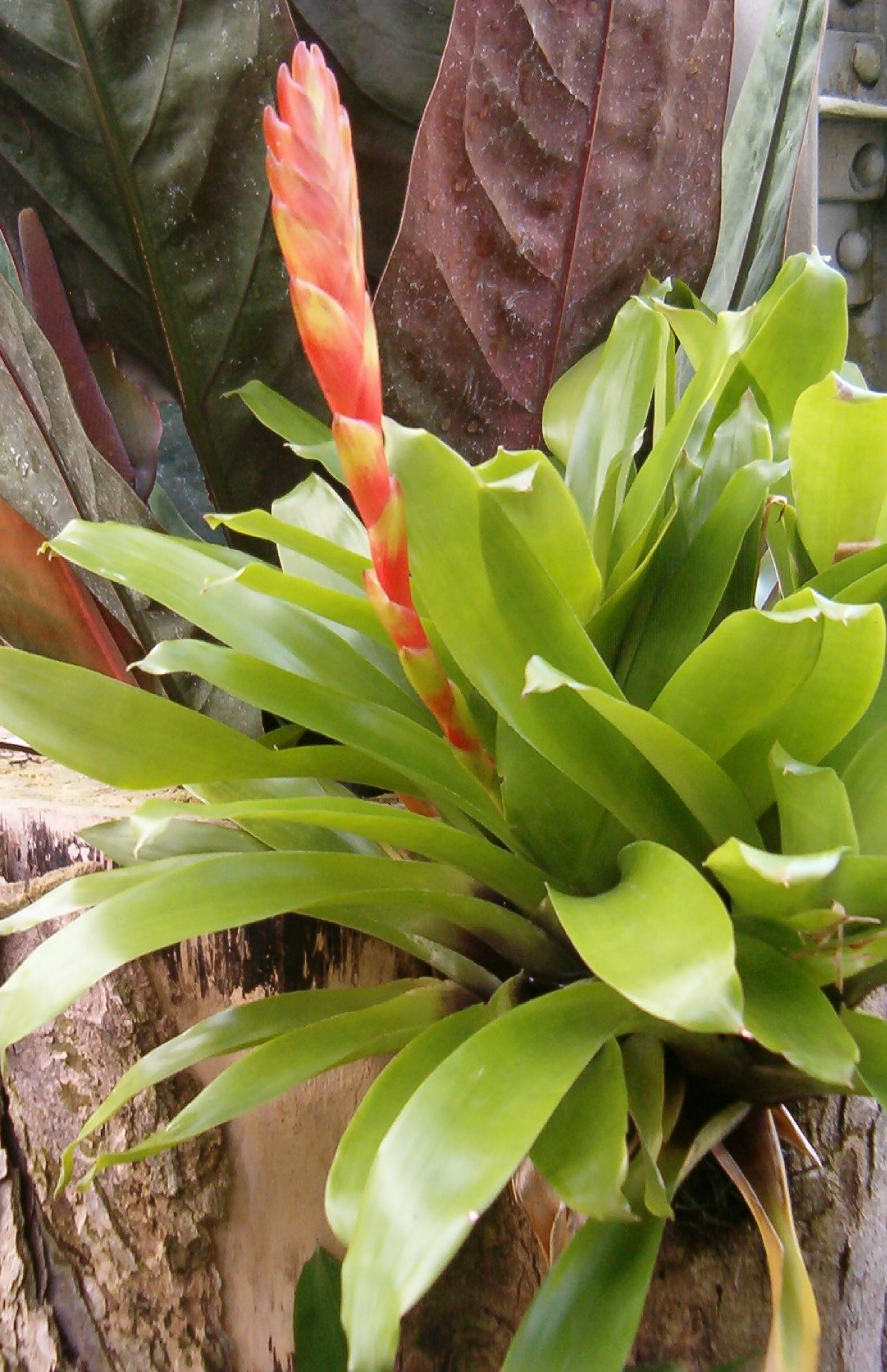
- Vriesea duvaliana

Scientific classification
- Kingdom: Plantae
- Clade: Tracheophytes
- Clade: Angiosperms
- Clade: Monocots
- Clade: Commelinids
- Order: Poales
- Family: Bromeliaceae
- Subfamily: Tillandsioideae
- Genus: Vriesea; Lindl.

Synonyms
- Hexalepis Raf.; Vrieseida Rojas Acosta; Neovriesia Britton

= Vriesea =

Genus of epiphytes

Vriesea is a genus of flowering plants in the botanical family Bromeliaceae, subfamily Tillandsioideae. The genus is named after the Dutch botanist and physician Willem Hendrik de Vriese (1806–1862). Its species are widespread over Mexico, Central America, South America and the West Indies.

The genus includes many "tank bromeliads", which store water in a reservoir (a "tank") formed by their tightly overlapping leaf bases. Containing some of the largest bromeliad species, these tropical plants hold a wide variety of insect fauna. In the wild, some frog species go through their whole life cycle in these bromeliad tanks. This genus is closely related to Guzmania. Both Guzmania and Vriesea have dry capsules that split open to release parachute like seeds similar to dandelions (Taraxacum sp.). Most Vriesea are epiphytes and grow on trees. Their roots function mainly as holdfasts with a more minor role in nutrient uptake. Nutrients are predominantly absorbed from the reservoirs made by the rosette of leaves.

== Species ==
As of October 2022, Plants of the World Online accepted the following species:

- Vriesea agostiniana E.Pereira – Rio de Janeiro (Brazil)
- Vriesea alta (Baker) É.Morren ex Mez – Panama
- Vriesea altimontana E.Pereira & Martinelli – Rio de Janeiro (Brazil)
- Vriesea altodaserrae L.B.Sm. – from Rio de Janeiro to Santa Catarina (Brazil)
- Vriesea altomacaensis A.Costa – Rio de Janeiro (Brazil)
- Vriesea altomayoensis H.Luther & K.F.Norton – Peru
- Vriesea amethystina É.Morren – Espírito Santo + Rio de Janeiro (Brazil)
- Vriesea andaraiensis Leme – Bahia (Brazil)
- Vriesea andreettae Rauh – Azuay Province of Ecuador
- Vriesea appendiculata (L.B.Sm.) L.B.Sm. – Loja Province of Ecuador
- Vriesea arachnoidea A.Costa – Minas Gerais, Rio de Janeiro (Brazil)
- Vriesea arpocalyx (André) L.B.Sm. – Ecuador
- Vriesea atra Mez – from Bahia to Santa Catarina (Brazil)
- Vriesea atrococcinea Rauh – Rio de Janeiro (Brazil)
- Vriesea atropurpurea Silveira – Minas Gerais (Brazil)
- Vriesea aureoramosa F.P.Uribbe & A.F.Costa – Espírito Santo (Brazil)
- Vriesea bahiana Leme – Bahia (Brazil)
- Vriesea barbosae J.A.Siqueira & Leme – Pernambuco (Brazil)
- Vriesea barilletii É.Morren – Espírito Santo (Brazil)
- Vriesea baturitensis Versieux & Tomaz – Ceará (Brazil)
- Vriesea biguassuensis Reitz – Santa Catarina in southern Brazil
- Vriesea billbergioides É.Morren ex Mez – São Paulo, Minas Gerais, Rio de Janeiro (Brazil)
- Vriesea bituminosa Wawra – Venezuela, eastern Brazil
- Vriesea blackburniana Leme – Bahia (Brazil)
- Vriesea bleheri Roeth & W.Weber – Rio de Janeiro (Brazil)
- Vriesea boeghii H.Luther – Loja Province of Ecuador
- Vriesea breviscapa (E.Pereira & I.A.Penna) Leme – Bahia, Espírito Santo (Brazil)
- Vriesea × brueggemannii J.Z.Matos, M.B.Crespo & Juan
- Vriesea brusquensis Reitz – from São Paulo to Santa Catarina (Brazil)
- Vriesea cacuminis L.B.Sm. – Minas Gerais (Brazil)
- Vriesea calimaniana Leme & W.Till – Espírito Santo (Brazil)
- Vriesea capixabae Leme – Espírito Santo (Brazil)
- Vriesea carinata Wawra – eastern + southern Brazil
- Vriesea carmeniae R.L.Moura & A.F.Costa – Ceará (Brasil)
- Vriesea castaneobulbosa (Mez & Wercklé) J.R.Grant – Costa Rica
- Vriesea cathcartii H.Luther – Ecuador
- Vriesea cearensis L.B.Sm. – Ceará (Brazil)
- Vriesea cereicola (Mez) L.B.Sm. – Peru
- Vriesea chapadensis Leme – Bahia (Brazil)
- Vriesea cipoensis O.B.C.Ribeiro, C.C.Paula & Guarçoni – Minas Gerais (Brazil)
- Vriesea claudiana Leme, Trind.-Lima & O.B.C.Ribeiro – Minas Gerais (Brazil)
- Vriesea clausseniana (Baker) Mez – Minas Gerais (Brazil)
- Vriesea colnagoi E.Pereira & I.A.Penna – Espírito Santo (Brazil)
- Vriesea confusa L.B.Sm. – Nariño region of Colombia
- Vriesea corcovadensis (Britton) Mez – from Bahia to Santa Catarina (Brazil)
- Vriesea correia-arauji E.Pereira & I.A.Penna – Rio de Janeiro and São Paulo (Brazil)
- Vriesea crassa Mez – Minas Gerais, Rio de Janeiro (Brazil)
- Vriesea curvispica Rauh – Peru
- Vriesea cylindrica L.B.Sm. – Peru, Ecuador, Colombia
- Vriesea debilis Leme – Espírito Santo
- Vriesea declinata Leme – Santa Catarina in southern Brazil
- Vriesea delicatula L.B.Sm. – Espírito Santo (Brazil)
- Vriesea densiflora Mez – Minas Gerais (Brazil)
- Vriesea diamantinensis Leme – Minas Gerais (Brazil)
- Vriesea dictyographa Leme – Bahia (Brazil)
- Vriesea dissitiflora (C.Wright) Mez – Cuba
- Vriesea drepanocarpa (Baker) Mez – from Bahia to Santa Catarina (Brazil)
- Vriesea drewii L.B.Sm. – Ecuador
- Vriesea dubia (L.B.Sm.) L.B.Sm. – Colombia, Peru, Ecuador
- Vriesea duidae (L.B.Sm.) Gouda – Guyana, Venezuela
- Vriesea duvaliana É.Morren – Bahia (Brazil)
- Vriesea elata (Baker) L.B.Sm. – Colombia, Venezuela, Ecuador
- Vriesea eltoniana E.Pereira & Ivo – Rio de Janeiro (Brazil)
- Vriesea ensiformis (Vell.) Beer, including Vriesea warmingii – from Bahia to Santa Catarina (Brazil)
- Vriesea erythrodactylon (É.Morren) É.Morren ex Mez – from Espírito Santo to Santa Catarina (Brazil)
- Vriesea exaltata Leme – Bahia (Brazil)
- Vriesea fenestralis Linden & André – Espírito Santo, Rio de Janeiro (Brazil)
- Vriesea fibrosa L.B.Sm. – Amazonas State in Venezuela
- Vriesea fidelensis Leme – Rio de Janeiro (Brazil)
- Vriesea flammea L.B.Sm. – northeastern, southeastern and southern Brazil
- Vriesea flava And.Costa, H.Luther & Wand. – from São Paulo to Santa Catarina (Brazil)
- Vriesea fluminensis E.Pereira – Rio de Janeiro (Brazil)
- Vriesea fluviatilis Kessous & A.F.Costa – Rio de Janeiro (Brazil)
- Vriesea fontanae Fraga & Leme – Espírito Santo (Brazil)
- Vriesea fontourae B.R.Silva – Rio de Janeiro (Brazil)
- Vriesea fosteriana L.B.Sm. – Espírito Santo (Brazil)
- Vriesea fradensis And.Costa – Rio de Janeiro (Brazil)
- Vriesea freicanecana J.A.Siqueira & Leme – Pernambuco (Brazil)
- Vriesea friburgensis Mez – Brazil, Bolivia, Argentina, Paraguay
- Vriesea garlippiana Leme – Rio de Janeiro (Brazil)
- Vriesea gelatinosa R.L.Moura & A.F.Costa
- Vriesea gigantea Gaudich. – from Bahia to Santa Catarina (Brazil)
- Vriesea gladioflammans E.Pereira & Reitz – Rio de Janeiro (Brazil)
- Vriesea gracilior (L.B.Sm.) Leme – Espírito Santo (Brazil)
- Vriesea graciliscapa W.Weber – Bahia (Brazil)
- Vriesea gradata (Baker) Mez – southeastern Brazil
- Vriesea grandiflora Leme – Minas Gerais, Rio de Janeiro (Brazil)
- Vriesea guttata Linden & André – southern Brazil
- Vriesea harmsiana (L.B.Sm.) L.B.Sm. – Peru
- Vriesea heterostachys (Baker) L.B.Sm. – southern Brazil
- Vriesea hieroglyphica (Carrière) É.Morren – from Espírito Santo to Paraná (Brazil)
- Vriesea hitchcockiana (L.B.Sm.) L.B.Sm. – Ecuador, Peru
- Vriesea hodgei L.B.Sm. – Colombia
- Vriesea hoehneana L.B.Sm. – southern Brazil
- Vriesea hydrophora Ule – southern Brazil
- Vriesea incurva (Griseb.) Read – Costa Rica, Panama, Cuba, Hispaniola, Jamaica, Colombia, Venezuela, Guyana, Ecuador, Bolivia
- Vriesea incurvata Gaudich. – southern Brazil
- Vriesea inflata (Wawra) Wawra – from Espírito Santo to Santa Catarina (Brazil)
- Vriesea interrogatoria L.B.Sm. – from Minas Gerais to São Paulo (Brazil)
- Vriesea itatiaiae Wawra – southern Brazil
- Vriesea johnstonii (Mez) L.B.Sm. & Pittendr. – Trinidad, Venezuela, Guyana
- Vriesea jonesiana Leme – São Paulo (Brazil)
- Vriesea jonghei (K.Koch) É.Morren – Trinidad & Tobago, French Guiana, Brazil
- Vriesea joyae E.Pereira & I.A.Penna – Rio de Janeiro (Brazil)
- Vriesea kautskyana E.Pereira & I.A.Penna – Espírito Santo, Rio de Janeiro (Brazil)
- Vriesea koideae Rauh – Peru
- Vriesea lancifolia (Baker) L.B.Sm. – Bahia (Brazil)
- Vriesea languida L.B.Sm. – Espírito Santo (Brazil)
- Vriesea laxa Mez – Venezuela
- Vriesea leptantha Harms – Rio de Janeiro (Brazil)
- Vriesea lidicensis Reitz – Rio de Janeiro (Brazil)
- Vriesea lilliputiana Leme – Bahia (Brazil)
- Vriesea limae L.B.Sm. – Pernambuco (Brazil)
- Vriesea limonensis Rauh – Ecuador
- Vriesea linharesiae Leme & J.A.Siqueira – Bahia (Brazil)
- Vriesea longicaulis (Baker) Mez – from Bahia to Santa Catarina (Brazil)
- Vriesea longiscapa Ule – southern Brazil
- Vriesea longisepala A.F.Costa – Bahia (Brazil)
- Vriesea longistaminea C.C.Paula & Leme – Minas Gerais (Brazil)
- Vriesea lubbersii (Baker) É.Morren ex Mez – from Espírito Santo to Santa Catarina (Brazil)
- Vriesea lutheriana J.R.Grant – Costa Rica
- Vriesea macrostachya (Bello) Mez – Cuba, Haiti, Puerto Rico, Trinidad; Carabobo State in Venezuela
- Vriesea maculosa Mez – Bahia (Brazil)
- Vriesea magna F.P.Uribbe & A.F.Costa
- Vriesea maguirei L.B.Sm. – Venezuela, northern Brazil
- Vriesea marceloi Versieux & T.Machado – Minas Gerais (Brazil)
- Vriesea maxoniana (L.B.Sm.) L.B.Sm. – Bolivia and Salta Province of Argentina
- Vriesea medusa Versieux – Minas Gerais (Brazil)
- Vriesea melgueiroi I.Ramírez & Carnevali Amazonas State (Venezuela)
- Vriesea menescalii E.Pereira & Leme – Espírito Santo (Brazil)
- Vriesea michaelii W.Weber – Rio de Janeiro (Brazil); probably extinct
- Vriesea microrachis J.Gomes-da-Silva & A.F.Costa – São Paulo and Rio de Janeiro (Brazil)
- Vriesea mimosoensis D.R.Couto, Kessous & A.F.Costa – Espírito Santo (Brazil)
- Vriesea minarum L.B.Sm. – Minas Gerais (Brazil)
- Vriesea minor (L.B.Sm.) Leme – Minas Gerais (Brazil)
- Vriesea minuta Leme – Bahia (Brazil)
- Vriesea minutiflora Leme – Bahia (Brazil)
- Vriesea mitoura L.B.Sm. – Amazonas State of Venezuela; Roraima
- Vriesea modesta Mez – Espírito Santo, Rio de Janeiro (Brazil)
- Vriesea mollis Leme – Rio de Janeiro (Brazil)
- Vriesea monacorum L.B.Sm. – Minas Gerais (Brazil)
- Vriesea morrenii Wawra (also spelt Vriesea morreni) – Espírito Santo to Rio de Janeiro (Brazil)
- Vriesea × morreniana É.Morren
- Vriesea mourae Kessous, B.Neves & A.F.Costa – São Paulo and Rio de Janeiro (Brazil)
- Vriesea muelleri Mez – from São Paulo to Santa Catarina (Brazil)
- Vriesea myriantha (Baker) Betancur (syn. Tillandsia myriantha)
- Vriesea nanuzae Leme – Minas Gerais (Brazil)
- Vriesea neoglutinosa Mez – from Bahia to Santa Catarina (Brazil)
- Vriesea noblickii Martinelli & Leme – Bahia (Brazil)
- Vriesea nubicola Leme – Rio de Janeiro (Brazil)
- Vriesea oligantha (Baker) Mez – Bahia and Minas Gerais (Brazil)
- Vriesea olmosana L.B.Sm. – Ecuador, Peru
- Vriesea organensis Kessous & A.F. Costa – Rio de Janeiro (Brazil)
- Vriesea oxapampae Rauh – Pasco Province of Peru
- Vriesea pabstii McWill. & L.B.Sm. – Espírito Santo, São Paulo (Brazil)
- Vriesea paradoxa Mez – Bahia (Brazil)
- Vriesea paraibica Wawra – Rio de Janeiro (Brazil)
- Vriesea paratiensis E.Pereira – from Rio de Janeiro to Paraná (Brazil)
- Vriesea pardalina Mez – southern Brazil
- Vriesea parviflora L.B.Sm. – Espírito Santo (Brazil)
- Vriesea parvula Rauh – São Paulo (Brazil)
- Vriesea pastuchoffiana Glaz. ex Mez – Rio de Janeiro (Brazil)
- Vriesea patula (Mez) L.B.Sm. – Ecuador, Peru
- Vriesea pauciflora Mez – Rio de Janeiro (Brazil)
- Vriesea pauperrima E.Pereira – northeastern, southeastern and southern Brazil
- Vriesea penduliflora L.B.Sm. – Minas Gerais, Rio de Janeiro (Brazil)
- Vriesea penduliscapa Rauh – Moreno-Santiago region of Ecuador
- Vriesea pereirae L.B.Sm. – Espírito Santo (Brazil)
- Vriesea pereziana (André) L.B.Sm. – Colombia, Peru
- Vriesea petraea (L.B.Sm.) L.B.Sm. – El Oro province of Ecuador
- Vriesea philippocoburgi Wawra – from Rio de Janeiro to Rio Grande do Sul (Brazil)
- Vriesea pinottii Reitz – southern Brazil
- Vriesea piscatrix Versieux & Wand. – Minas Gerais (Brazil)
- Vriesea platynema Gaudich. – Cuba, Jamaica, Trinidad, Venezuela, Guyana, Brazil, Misiones Provindce of Argentina
- Vriesea platzmannii É.Morren – southern Brazil
- Vriesea pleiosticha (Griseb.) Gouda (synonym Mezobromelia pleiosticha) – Costa Rica, Panama, Trinidad, Venezuela, the Guianas, Peru, Ecuador, northern Brazil
- Vriesea poenulata (Baker) É.Morren ex Mez – Espírito Santo, Rio de Janeiro (Brazil)
- Vriesea portentosa Leme – Minas Gerais (Brazil)
- Vriesea procera (Mart. ex Schult. & Schult.f.) Wittm. – Trinidad, Venezuela, the Guianas, Peru, Ecuador, Brazil, Paraguay, Bolivia, Argentina
- Vriesea pseudoatra Leme – Rio de Janeiro (Brazil)
- Vriesea pseudoligantha Philcox – Bahia (Brazil)
- Vriesea psittacina (Hook.) Lindl. – Brazil, Paraguay
- Vriesea pulchra Leme & L.Kollmann – Espírito Santo (Brazil)
- Vriesea punctulata E.Pereira & I.A.Penna – Rio de Janeiro (Brazil)
- Vriesea racinae L.B.Sm. – Espírito Santo, Minas Gerais (Brazil)
- Vriesea rafaelii Leme – Minas Gerais (Brazil)
- Vriesea rastrensis Leme – Santa Catarina in southern Brazil
- Vriesea rectifolia Rauh – Pernambuco (Brazil) but probably extinct
- Vriesea recurvata Gaudich. – Bahia (Brazil)
- Vriesea regnellii Mez – Minas Gerais, Rio de Janeiro (Brazil)
- Vriesea reitzii Leme & And.Costa – southern Brazil
- Vriesea repandostachys Leme – Espírito Santo (Brazil)
- Vriesea × retroflexa É.Morren
- Vriesea revoluta B.R.Silva – Espírito Santo (Brazil)
- Vriesea rhodostachys L.B.Sm. – Bahia, Espírito Santo (Brazil)
- Vriesea roberto-seidelii W.Weber – Bahia (Brazil)
- Vriesea robusta (Griseb.) L.B.Sm. – Colombia, Venezuela
- Vriesea rodigasiana É.Morren – from Bahia to Santa Catarina (Brazil)
- Vriesea roethii W.Weber – Rio de Janeiro (Brazil)
- Vriesea rubens J.Gomes-da-Silva & A.F.Costa – Santa Catarina (Brazil)
- Vriesea rubra (Ruiz & Pav.) Beer – Trinidad, Venezuela, Colombia, Peru, Brazil, Guyana
- Vriesea rubrobracteata Rauh – Colombia
- Vriesea rubroviridis F.P.Uribbe & A.F.Costa – from São Paulo to Rio Grande do Sul (Brazil)
- Vriesea rubyae E.Pereira – Rio de Janeiro (Brazil)
- Vriesea ruschii L.B.Sm. – Minas Gerais, Bahia, Espírito Santo (Brazil)
- Vriesea sagasteguii L.B.Sm. – Peru
- Vriesea saltensis Leme & L.Kollmann – Minas Gerais (Brazil)
- Vriesea sanctaparecidae Leme – Minas Gerais (Brazil)
- Vriesea sanfranciscana Versieux & Wand. – Minas Gerais (Brazil)
- Vriesea santaleopoldinensis Leme & L.Kollmann – Espírito Santo (Brazil)
- Vriesea saundersii (Carrière) É.Morren (synonym Vriesea botafogensis) – Rio de Janeiro (Brazil)
- Vriesea saxicola L.B.Sm. – Minas Gerais (Brazil)
- Vriesea sazimae Leme – Minas Gerais, São Paulo (Brazil)
- Vriesea scalaris É.Morren – Venezuela, Brazil
- Vriesea sceptrum Mez – from Bahia to São Paulo (Brazil)
- Vriesea schultesiana L.B.Sm. – Colombia
- Vriesea schunkii Leme – Espírito Santo (Brazil)
- Vriesea schwackeana Mez – from Bahia to São Paulo (Brazil)
- Vriesea secundiflora Leme – Rio de Janeiro, São Paulo (Brazil)
- Vriesea segadas-viannae L.B.Sm. – Minas Gerais (Brazil)
- Vriesea seideliana W.Weber – Espírito Santo (Brazil)
- Vriesea serrana E.Pereira & I.A.Penna – Rio de Janeiro (Brazil)
- Vriesea serranegrensis Leme – Minas Gerais (Brazil)
- Vriesea silvana Leme – Bahia (Brazil)
- Vriesea simplex (Vell.) Beer – Trinidad, Venezuela, Colombia, Brazil
- Vriesea simulans Leme – Minas Gerais (Brazil)
- Vriesea sincorana Mez – Bahia (Brazil)
- Vriesea skotakii H.Luther & K.F.Norton – Panama
- Vriesea socialis L.B.Sm. – Colombia, Venezuela
- Vriesea sparsiflora L.B.Sm. – from Espírito Santo to São Paulo (Brazil)
- Vriesea speckmaieri W.Till – Carabobo State of Venezuela
- Vriesea stricta L.B.Sm. – Minas Gerais (Brazil)
- Vriesea strobeliae Rauh – Ecuador
- Vriesea sucrei L.B.Sm. & Read – Rio de Janeiro (Brazil)
- Vriesea sulcata L.B.Sm. – Amazonas State of Venezuela
- Vriesea swartzii (Baker) Mez – Jamaica
- Vriesea takahashiana Leme & W.Till – Bahia (Brazil)
- Vriesea taritubensis E.Pereira & I.A.Penna – Rio de Janeiro to São Paulo (Brazil)
- Vriesea tequendamae (André) L.B.Sm. – Venezuela, Colombia, Ecuador, Peru
- Vriesea teresopolitana Leme – Rio de Janeiro (Brazil)
- Vriesea thyrsoidea Mez – Rio de Janeiro (Brazil)
- Vriesea tijucana E.Pereira – eastern Brazil
- Vriesea tillandsioides L.B.Sm. – Peru
- Vriesea triangularis Reitz – Santa Catarina (Brazil)
- Vriesea triligulata Mez – Rio de Janeiro (Brazil)
- Vriesea tubipetala Leme & R.L.Moura – Minas Gerais (Brazil)
- Vriesea unilateralis (Baker) Mez – from Espírito Santo to Santa Catarina (Brazil)
- Vriesea vagans (L.B.Sm.) L.B.Sm. – eastern + southern Brazil
- Vriesea vellozicola Leme & J.A.Siqueira – Espírito Santo (Brazil)
- Vriesea vexillata L.B.Sm. – Colombia
- Vriesea vidalii L.B.Sm. & Handro – Rio de Janeiro (Brazil)
- Vriesea vulpinoidea L.B.Sm. – from São Paulo to Santa Catarina (Brazil)
- Vriesea wawrana Antoine (also spelt Vriesea wawranea; synonym Vriesea oleosa) – Bahia, Rio de Janeiro (Brazil)
- Vriesea weberi E.Pereira & I.A.Penna – Espírito Santo (Brazil)
- Vriesea wuelfinghoffii Rauh & E.Gross – Azuay Province in Ecuador
- Vriesea wurdackii L.B.Sm. – Amazonas State of Venezuela
- Vriesea zamorensis (L.B.Sm.) L.B.Sm. – Ecuador, Peru
- Vriesea zildae R.L.Moura & A.F.Costa – Rio de Janeiro (Brazil)
- Vriesea zonata Leme & J.A.Siqueira – Alagoas State in eastern Brazil

== Former species ==
Species that have been placed in Vriesea but are not accepted by Plants of the World Online include:

- Vriesea brassicoides (Baker) Mez = Stigmatodon brassicoides – Rio de Janeiro (Brazil)
- Vriesea chontalensis (Baker) L.B.Sm. = Tillandsia chontalensis
- Vriesea chrysostachys É.Morren = Goudaea chrysostachys – Trinidad, Colombia, Peru
- Vriesea correia-araujoi E.Pereira & I.A.Penna – Rio de Janeiro, São Paulo (Brazil)
- Vriesea costae B.R.Silva & Leme = Stigmatodon costae – Rio de Janeiro (Brazil)
- Vriesea croceana Leme & G.K.Br. = Stigmatodon croceanus – Rio de Janeiro (Brazil)
- Vriesea didistichoides (Mez) L.B.Sm. = Tillandsia didistichoides
- Vriesea fontellana Leme & G.K.Br. = Stigmatodon fontellanus – Espírito Santo (Brazil)
- Vriesea fragrans (André) L.B.Sm. = Tillandsia fragrans
- Vriesea funebris L.B.Sm. = Stigmatodon funebris – Espírito Santo
- Vriesea gastiniana Leme & G.K.Br. = Stigmatodon gastinianus – Rio de Janeiro (Brazil)
- Vriesea glutinosa Lindl. = Lutheria glutinosa – Trinidad, Venezuela
- Vriesea goniorachis (Baker) Mez = Stigmatodon goniorachis – Rio de Janeiro (Brazil)
- Vriesea harrylutheri Leme & G.K.Br. = Stigmatodon harrylutheri – Espírito Santo (Brazil)
- Vriesea heterandra (André) L.B.Sm. = Tillandsia heterandra
- Vriesea malzinei É.Morren = Tillandsia malzinei – Mexico
- Vriesea melgueroi I. Ramírez & Carnevali – Amazonas State of Venezuela
- Vriesea monstrum (Mez) L.B.Sm. = Jagrantia monstrum – Colombia, Ecuador, Panama, Costa Rica, Nicaragua
- Vriesea ospinae H.Luther = Goudaea ospinae – Colombia
- Vriesea plurifolia Leme = Stigmatodon plurifolius – Espírito Santo (Brazil)
- Vriesea splendens (Brongn.) Lem. = Lutheria splendens – Venezuela, the Guianas, Trinidad & Tobago
- Vriesea vexata Leme

== Photo gallery ==
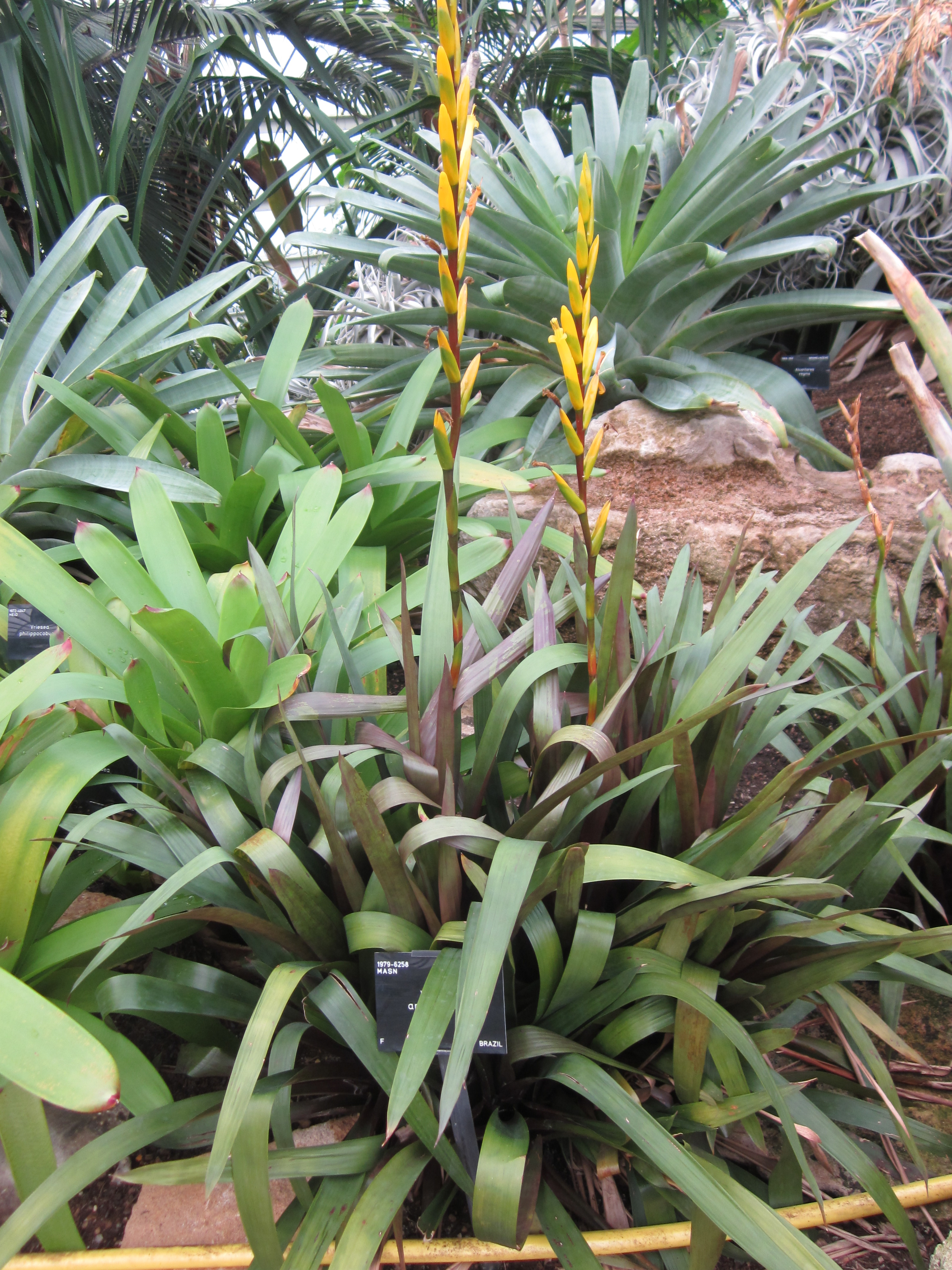
Vriesea amethystina

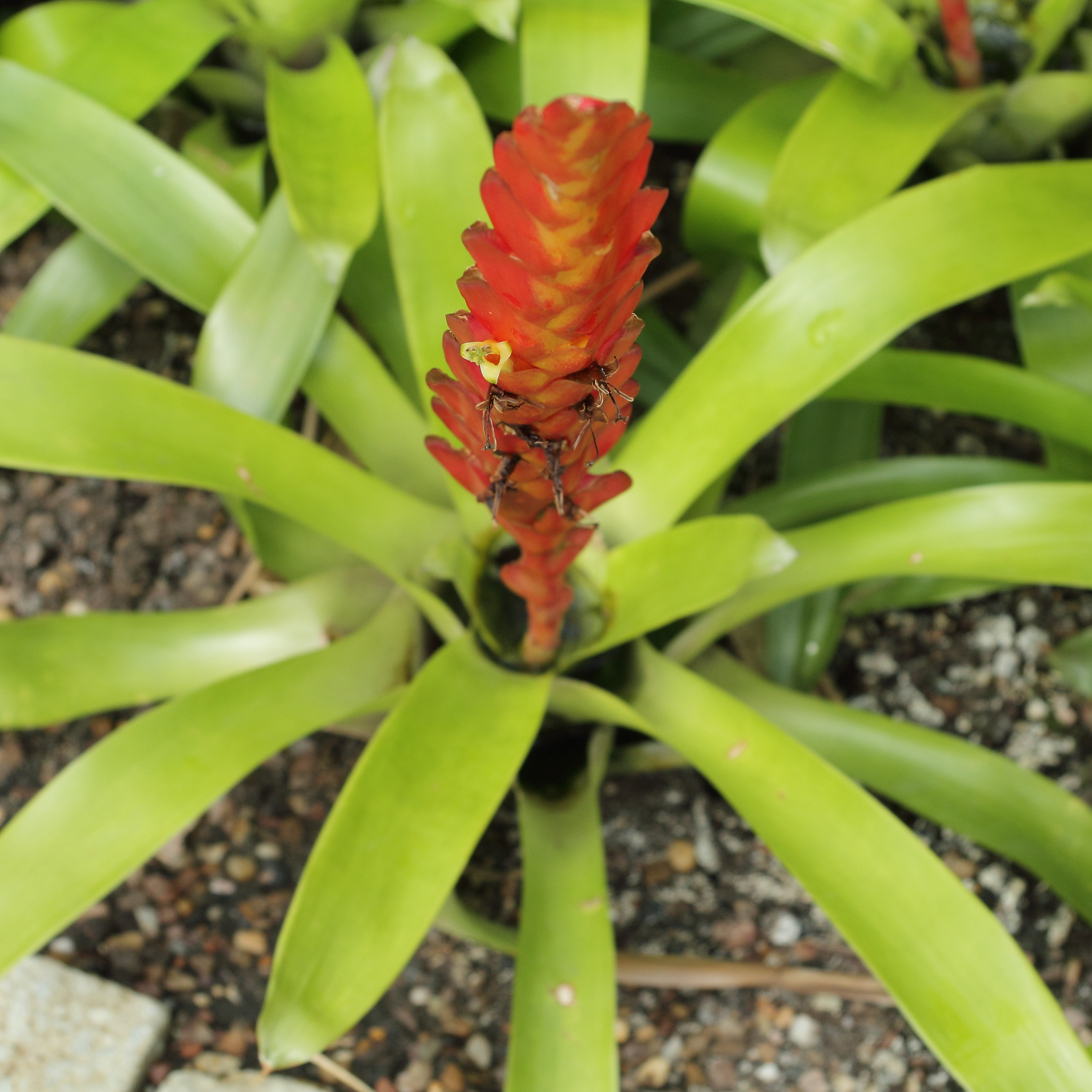
Vriesea duvaliana

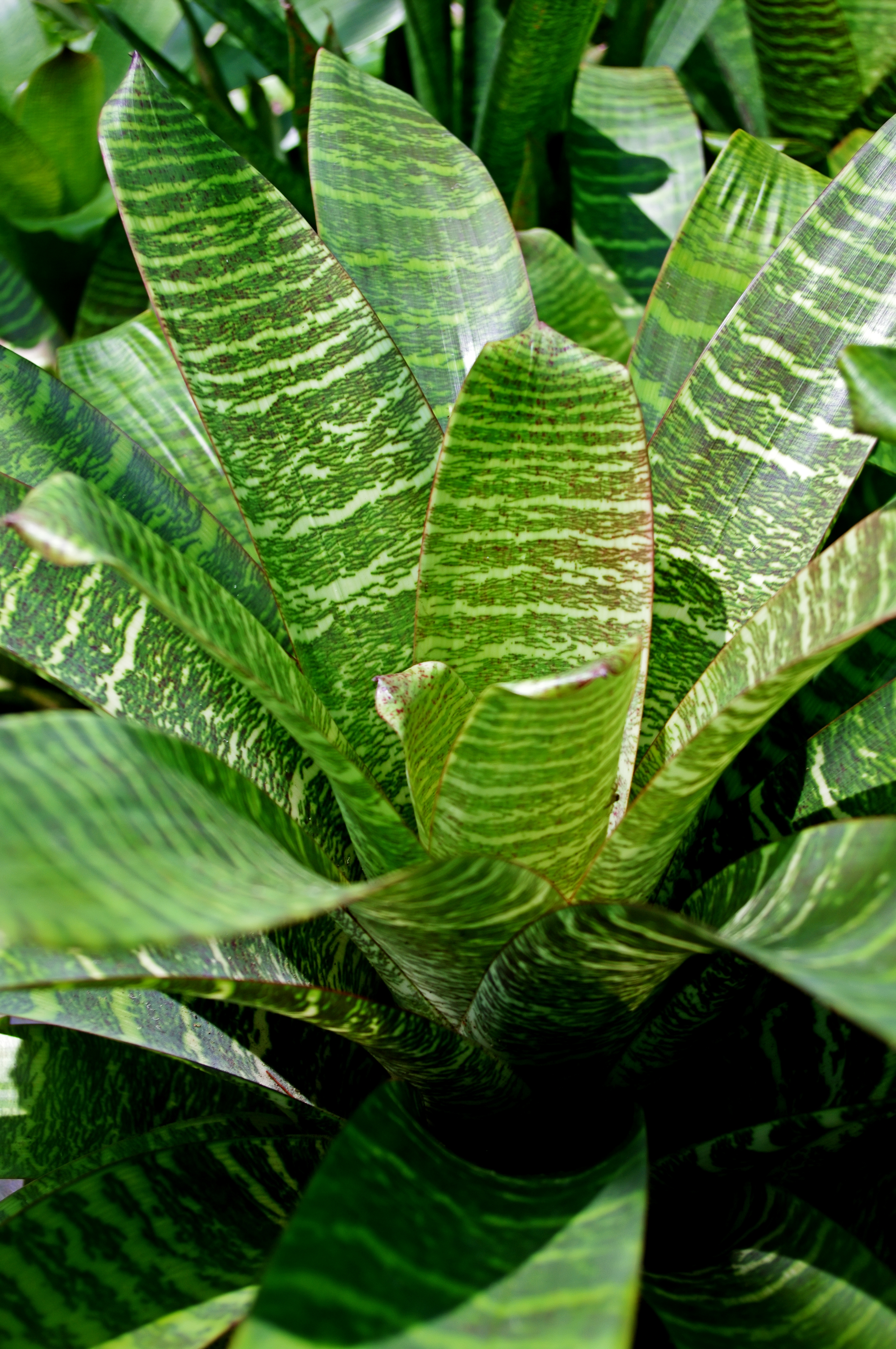
Vriesea hieroglyphica

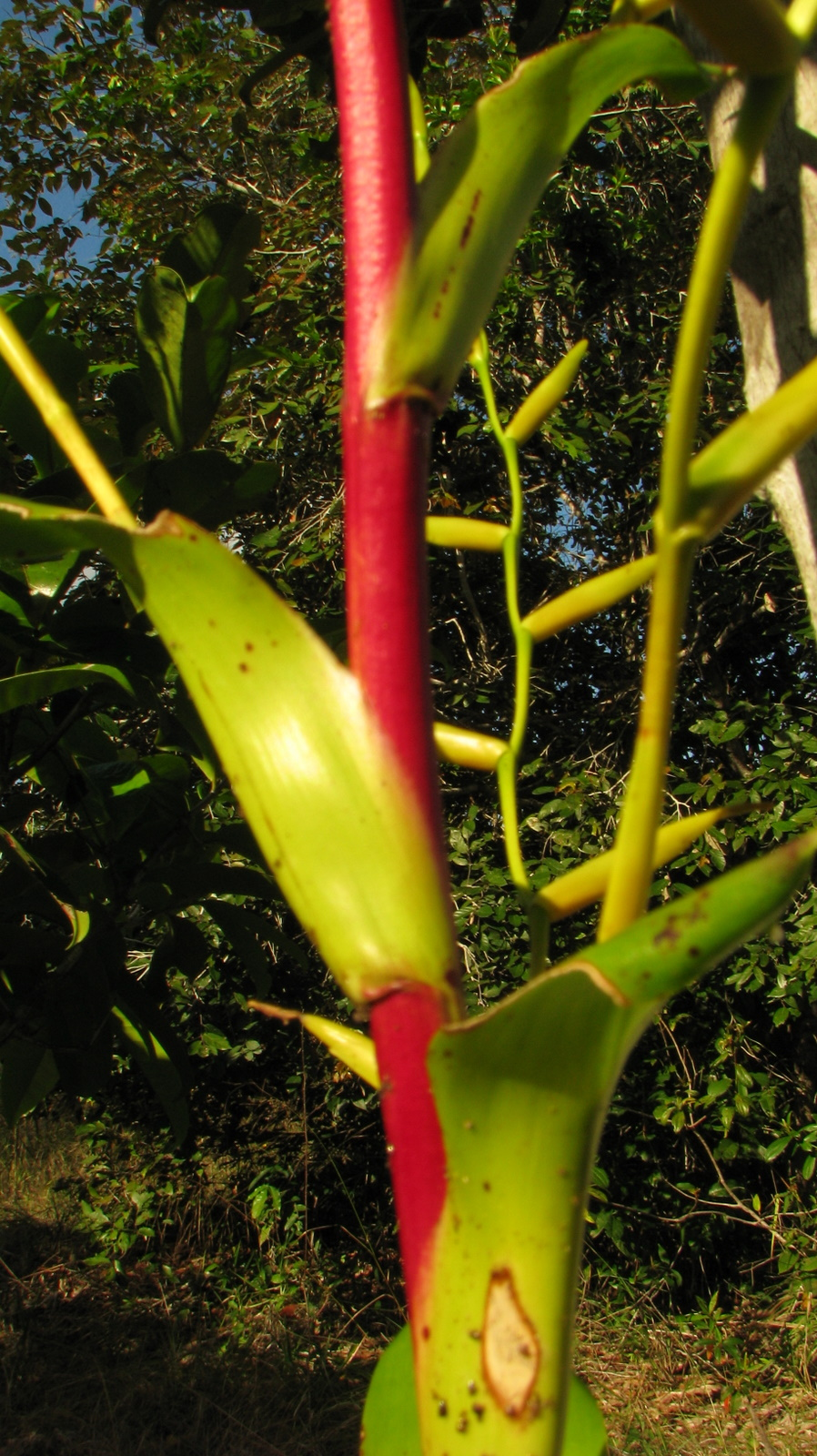
Vriesea procera

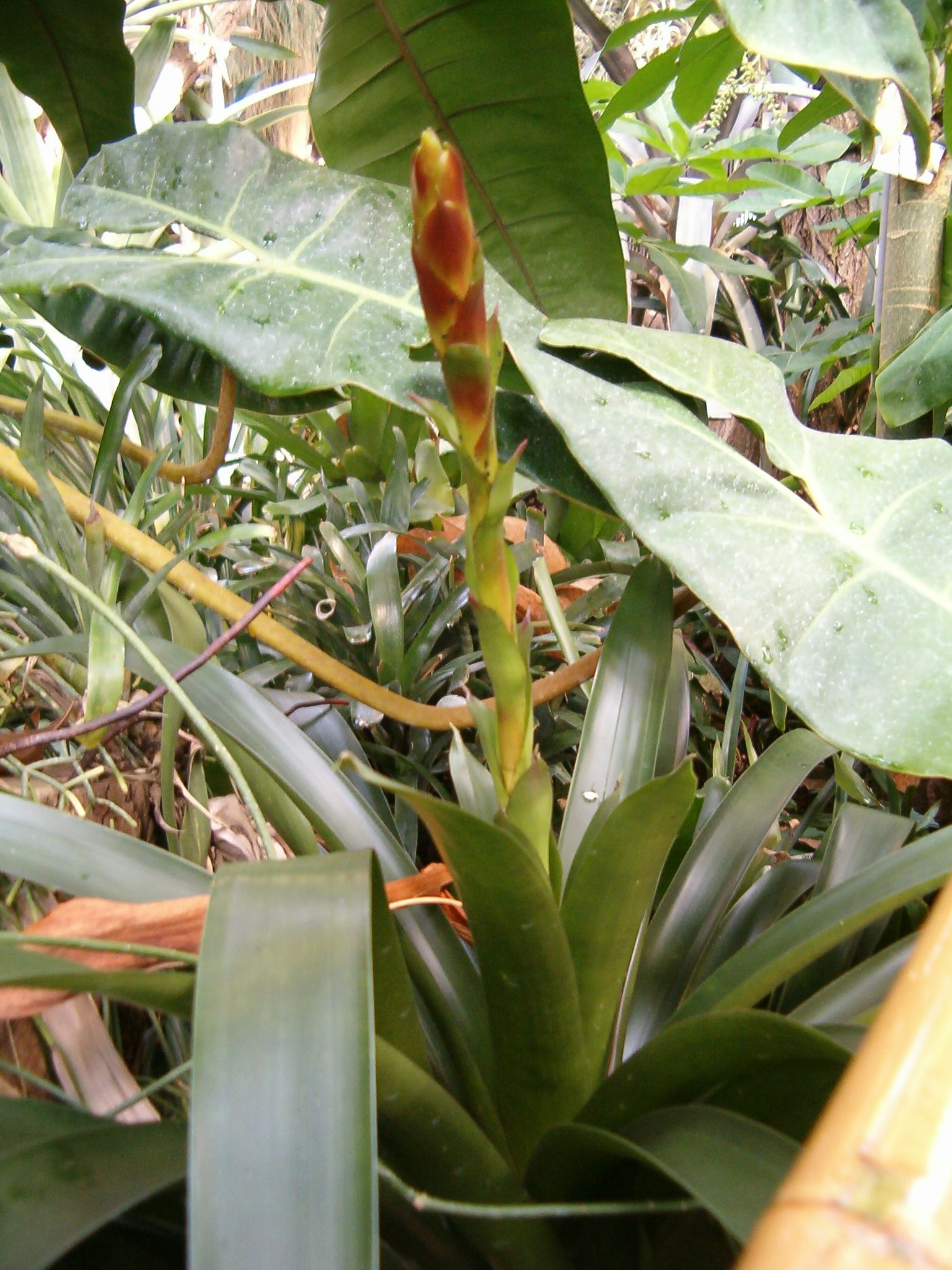
Vriesea schwackeana

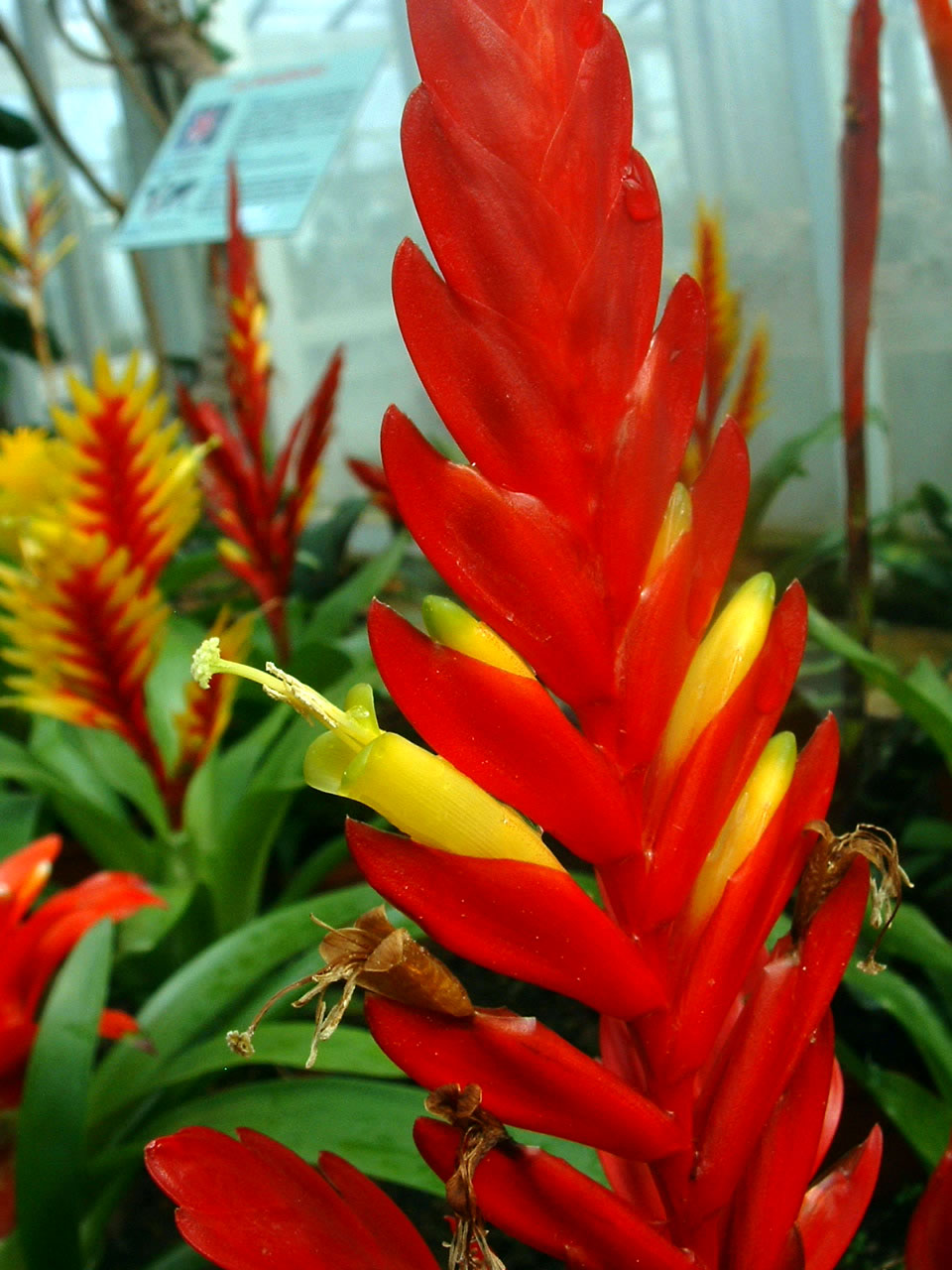
Vriesia cultivar
