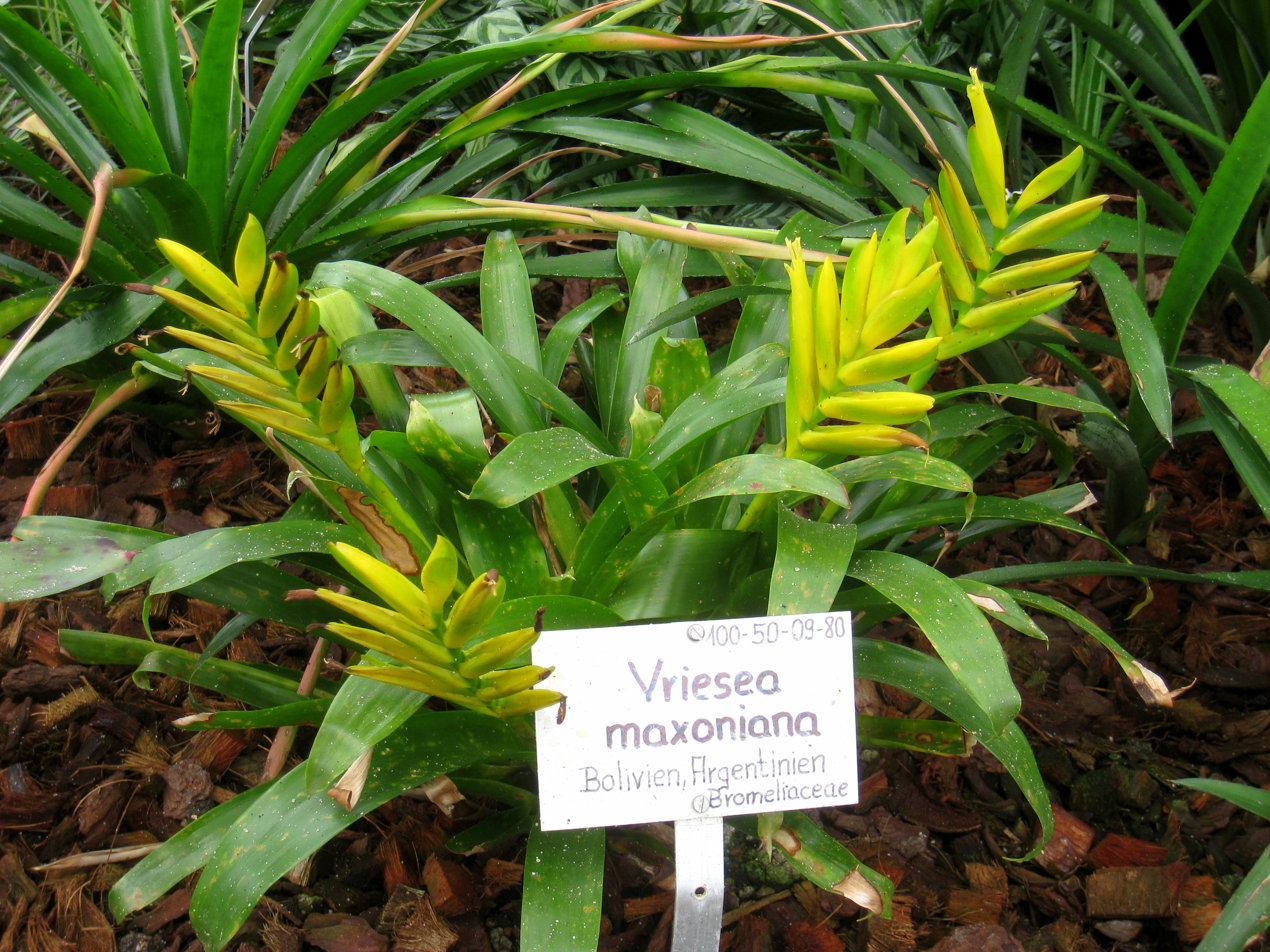

Scientific classification
- Kingdom: Plantae
- Clade: Tracheophytes
- Clade: Angiosperms
- Clade: Monocots
- Clade: Commelinids
- Order: Poales
- Family: Bromeliaceae
- Genus: Vriesea
- Species: V. maxoniana

Binomial name
- Vriesea maxoniana (L.B. Smith) L.B. Smith

= Vriesea maxoniana =

Species of flowering plant

Vriesea maxoniana is a plant species in the genus Vriesea. This species is native to Bolivia.
