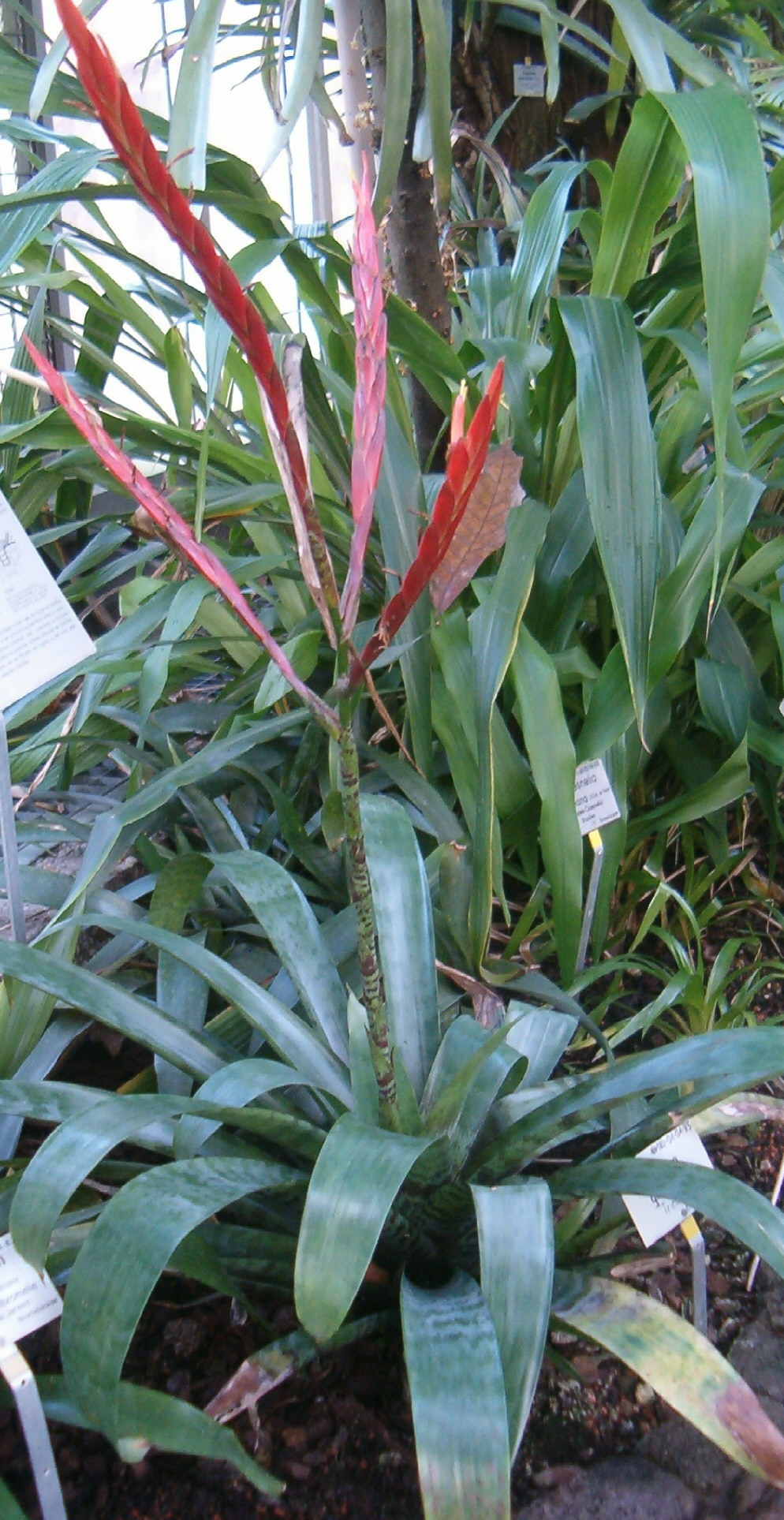

Scientific classification
- Kingdom: Plantae
- Clade: Tracheophytes
- Clade: Angiosperms
- Clade: Monocots
- Clade: Commelinids
- Order: Poales
- Family: Bromeliaceae
- Genus: Vriesea
- Species: V. glutinosa

Binomial name
- Vriesea glutinosa Lindley

Synonyms
- Tillandsia stenostachya Baker; Vriesea stenostachya (Baker) Mez

= Vriesea glutinosa =

Species of flowering plant

Vriesea glutinosa is a plant species in the genus Vriesea. It is native to Trinidad and to the State of Bolívar in southeastern Venezuela.

== Cultivars ==
- Vriesea 'Amelita'
- Vriesea 'Brasilia'
- Vriesea 'Carlsbad'
- Vriesea 'Double Pleasure'
- Vriesea 'Galaxy'
- Vriesea 'Johnson's #637'
- Vriesea 'Madam Pele'
- Vriesea 'Splendide'
- Vriesea 'Symphonie'
- Vriesea 'Towering Flame'
