= Vriesea chrysostachys =

Scientific classification
- Kingdom: Plantae
- Clade: Tracheophytes
- Clade: Angiosperms
- Clade: Monocots
- Clade: Commelinids
- Order: Poales
- Family: Bromeliaceae
- Genus: Vriesea
- Species: V. chrysostachys

Binomial name
- Vriesea chrysostachys E.Morren

Synonyms
- Tillandsia chrysostachys (E.Morren) Baker

Species of plant

Vriesea chrysostachys is a plant species in the genus Vriesea. It is an epiphyte native to Colombia, Peru, and Trinidad.

== Cultivars ==
- Vriesea 'Pactole'
