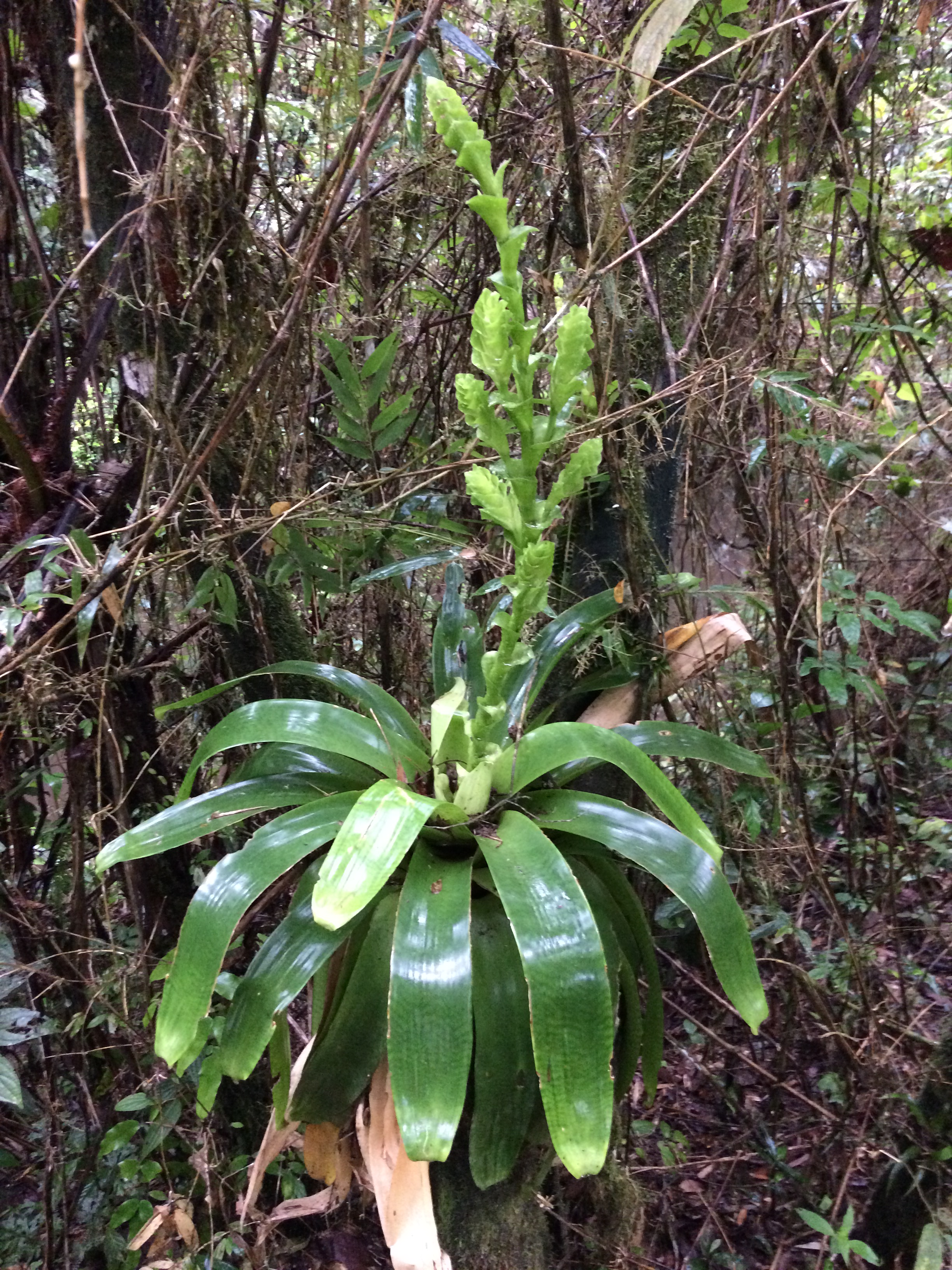
- São Paulo State - Brazil

Scientific classification
- Kingdom: Plantae
- Clade: Tracheophytes
- Clade: Angiosperms
- Clade: Monocots
- Clade: Commelinids
- Order: Poales
- Family: Bromeliaceae
- Genus: Vriesea
- Species: V. pabstii

Binomial name
- Vriesea pabstii McWilliams & L.B.Smith

= Vriesea pabstii =

Species of flowering plant

Vriesea pabstii is a plant species in the genus Vriesea. This species is endemic to Brazil (Espírito Santo and São Paulo States).
