= Vriesea arachnoidea =

Scientific classification
- Kingdom: Plantae
- Clade: Tracheophytes
- Clade: Angiosperms
- Clade: Monocots
- Clade: Commelinids
- Order: Poales
- Family: Bromeliaceae
- Genus: Vriesea
- Species: V. arachnoidea

Binomial name
- Vriesea arachnoidea A. Costa

Species of flowering plant

Vriesea arachnoidea is a plant species in the genus Vriesea, endemic to Brazil.
