= Vriesea barilletii =

Scientific classification
- Kingdom: Plantae
- Clade: Tracheophytes
- Clade: Angiosperms
- Clade: Monocots
- Clade: Commelinids
- Order: Poales
- Family: Bromeliaceae
- Genus: Vriesea
- Species: V. barilletii

Binomial name
- Vriesea barilletii E.Morren

Synonyms
- Tillandsia barilletii (E.Morren) Baker

Species of epiphyte

Vriesea barilletii is a plant species in the genus Vriesea. It is endemic to the State of Espírito Santo in eastern Brazil and widely cultivated elsewhere as an ornamental.

== Cultivars ==
1. Vriesea 'Brachystachys Major'
2. Vriesea 'Closoniana'
3. Vriesea 'Closoniana-Brachystachys-Major'
4. Vriesea 'Donneaina'
5. Vriesea 'Fire Rose'
6. Vriesea 'Flamme'
7. Vriesea 'Gloriosa'
8. Vriesea 'Gravisiana'
9. Vriesea 'Insignis H.L.B.'
10. Vriesea 'Inspektor Perring'
11. Vriesea 'Kitteliana'
12. Vriesea 'Leodiensis'
13. Vriesea 'Magnisiana'
14. Vriesea 'Magnusiana'
15. Vriesea 'Mariae'
16. Vriesea 'Morreno-Barilletii'
17. Vriesea 'Petersiana'
18. Vriesea 'President Oscar Lamarche'
19. Vriesea 'Psittacina-Picta'
20. Vriesea 'Purple Cockatoo'
21. Vriesea 'Ubanteniana'
22. Vriesea 'Wanteniana'
23. Vriesea 'Weyringeriana'
24. Vriesea 'Wiotiana'
25. Vriesea 'Wittmackiana'
