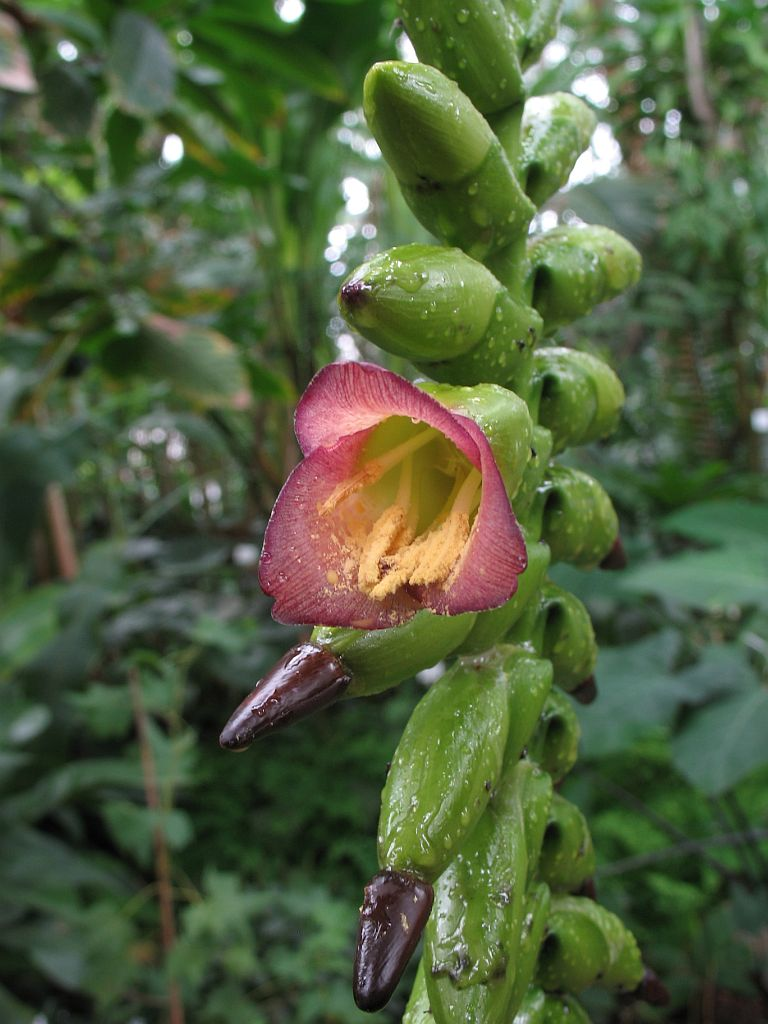
- As Vriesea oleosa

Scientific classification
- Kingdom: Plantae
- Clade: Tracheophytes
- Clade: Angiosperms
- Clade: Monocots
- Clade: Commelinids
- Order: Poales
- Family: Bromeliaceae
- Genus: Vriesea
- Species: V. wawrana

Binomial name
- Vriesea wawrana Antoine

Synonyms
- Tillandsia wawrana (Antoine) Baker; Vriesea oleosa Leme

= Vriesea wawrana =

Species of flowering plant

Vriesea wawrana is a plant species in the genus Vriesea. This species is endemic to Brazil.

The species was first described by Franz Antoine in 1884. It was named for Heinrich Ritter Wawra. Antoine spelt the epithet wawranea. Feminine adjectives formed from personal names must end in -ana and must be corrected if they do not according to Article 60.8 of the International Code of Nomenclature for algae, fungi, and plants; Plants of the World Online uses the spelling wawrana.
