= Vriesea melgueroi =

Scientific classification
- Kingdom: Plantae
- Clade: Tracheophytes
- Clade: Angiosperms
- Clade: Monocots
- Clade: Commelinids
- Order: Poales
- Family: Bromeliaceae
- Genus: Vriesea
- Species: V. melgueroi

Binomial name
- Vriesea melgueroi I.Ramírez & Carnevali

Species of flowering plant

Vriesea melgueroi is a plant species in genus Vriesea. This species is endemic to Venezuela.
