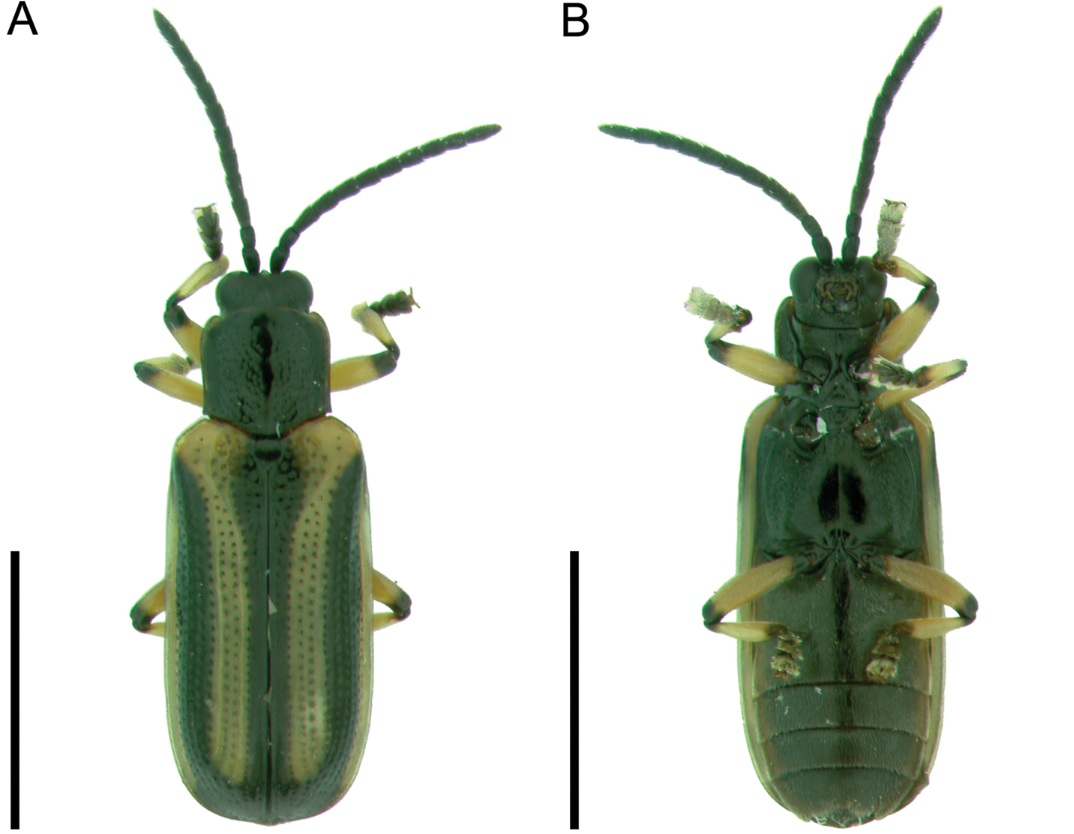

Scientific classification
- Kingdom: Animalia
- Phylum: Arthropoda
- Clade: Pancrustacea
- Class: Insecta
- Order: Coleoptera
- Suborder: Polyphaga
- Infraorder: Cucujiformia
- Family: Chrysomelidae
- Genus: Cephaloleia
- Species: C. kuprewiczae

Binomial name
- Cephaloleia kuprewiczae Garcia-Robledo & Staines, 2015

= Cephaloleia kuprewiczae =

Species of beetle

Cephaloleia kuprewiczae is a species of beetle of the family Chrysomelidae. It is found in Costa Rica. The habitat consists of tropical premontane and montane forests.

== Description ==
Adults reach a length of about 5-5.7 mm. The head, antennae and scutellum are brownish-black, while the pronotum is brownish-black with yellow lateral margins. The elytron is yellow with brownish-black sutural and subhumeral vittae.

== Biology ==
The recorded host plants are Pitcairnia arcuata and Pitcairnia brittoniana.

== Etymology ==
The species is named for Erin K. Kuprewicz, who discovered the species and its interaction with Pitcairnia (Bromeliaceae) host plants.
