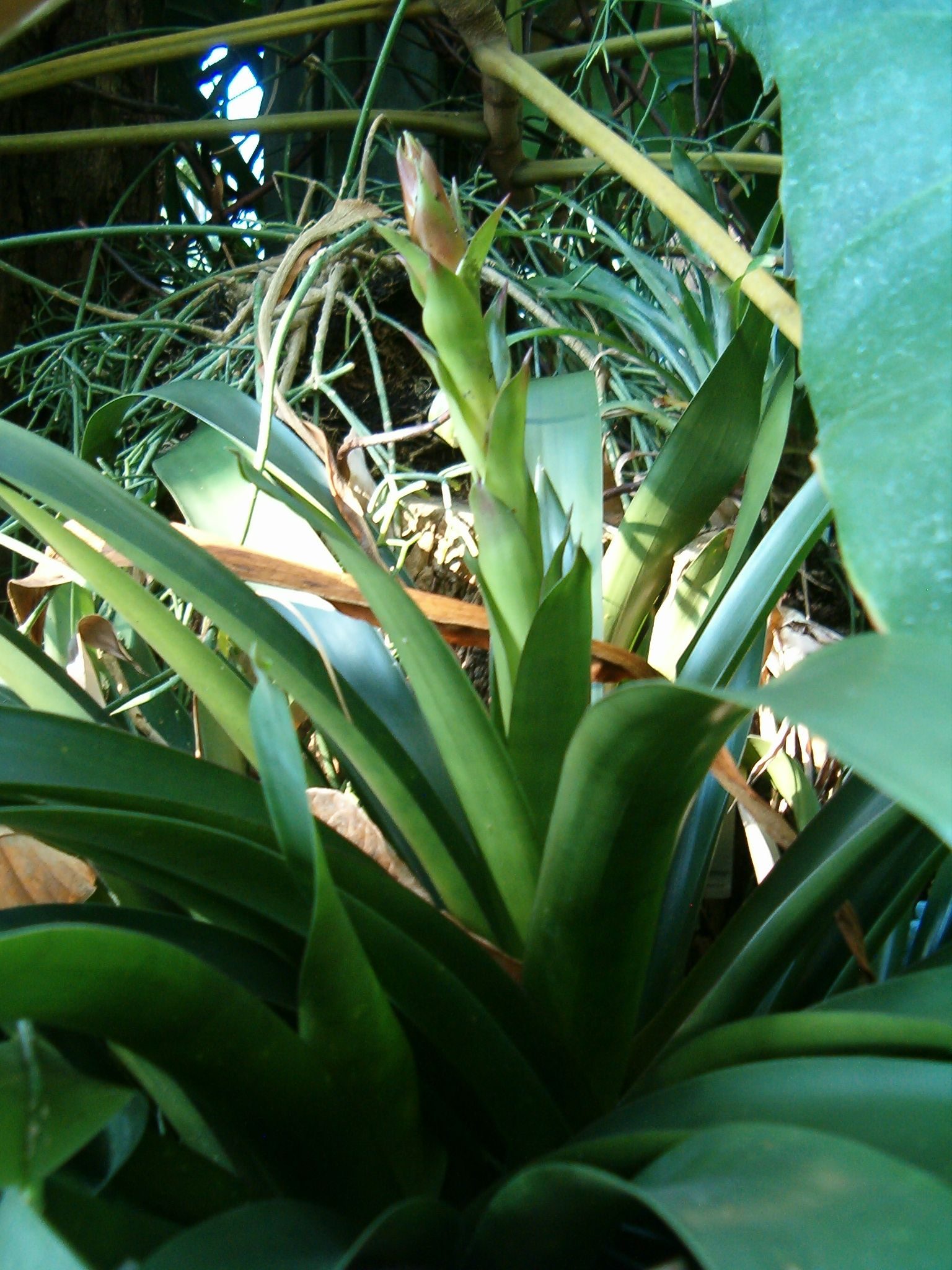

Scientific classification
- Kingdom: Plantae
- Clade: Embryophytes
- Clade: Tracheophytes
- Clade: Spermatophytes
- Clade: Angiosperms
- Clade: Monocots
- Clade: Commelinids
- Order: Poales
- Family: Bromeliaceae
- Genus: Vriesea
- Species: V. schwackeana

Binomial name
- Vriesea schwackeana Mez

= Vriesea schwackeana =

Species of flowering plant

Vriesea schwackeana is a species of flowering plant in the family Bromeliaceae. It is endemic to Brazil. It was first formally described by Carl Christian Mez in 1896, based on a specimen collected by W. Schwacke in the Serra de Ouro Preto, Minas Gerais.

== Description ==
Vriesea schwackeana is a perennial, typically epiphytic or saxicolous plant, meaning it grows on trees or rocks. It is found in rocky fields and Atlantic Forest remnants at altitudes between 1300 and 1500 meters, especially in the states of Minas Gerais and São Paulo.

== Taxonomy ==
=== Cultivars ===
Recognized cultivars include:

- Vriesea 'Derek's Dilemma'
- Vriesea 'Fire Dance'
- Vriesea 'Forever Amber'
- Vriesea 'Golden Dawn'
- Vriesea 'Karamea Bronze Queen'
- Vriesea 'Lucky 13'
- Vriesea 'Maroon Dream'
- Vriesea 'Peace Maker'
- Vriesea 'Peach Perfection'
- Vriesea 'Plantation Pride'
- Vriesea 'Red Rocket'
- Vriesea 'Southern Belle'
- Vriesea 'Tango'
- Vriesea 'Touch of Gold'
- Vriesea 'Vista Charm'
- Vriesea 'War Bonnet'
- Vriesea 'Yellow Rebel'
- × Vrieslandsia 'Gigant Flame'
