= Werauhia cowellii =

Scientific classification
- Kingdom: Plantae
- Clade: Embryophytes
- Clade: Tracheophytes
- Clade: Spermatophytes
- Clade: Angiosperms
- Clade: Monocots
- Clade: Commelinids
- Order: Poales
- Family: Bromeliaceae
- Genus: Werauhia
- Species: W. cowellii

Binomial name
- Werauhia cowellii (Mez & Britton) J.R.Grant

Synonyms
- Homotypic Synonyms: Tillandsia cowellii Mez & Britton; Vriesea cowellii (Mez & Britton) L.B.Sm.; Heterotypic Synonyms: Vriesea egregia L.B.Sm.

Species of flowering plant

Werauhia cowellii is a species of flowering plant in the family Bromeliaceae. This species is native to the Leeward Islands and Venezuela.
