= Werauhia singuliflora =

Scientific classification
- Kingdom: Plantae
- Clade: Embryophytes
- Clade: Tracheophytes
- Clade: Spermatophytes
- Clade: Angiosperms
- Clade: Monocots
- Clade: Commelinids
- Order: Poales
- Family: Bromeliaceae
- Genus: Werauhia
- Species: W. singuliflora

Binomial name
- Werauhia singuliflora (Mez & Wercklé) J.R.Grant

Synonyms
- Homotypic Synonyms: Thecophyllum singuliflorum Mez & Wercklé; Vriesea singuliflora (Mez & Wercklé) L.B.Sm. & Pittendr.

Species of flowering plant

Werauhia singuliflora is a species of flowering plant in the family Bromeliaceae. This species is endemic to Costa Rica.
