= Geissanthus pichinchae =

Conservation status
- Near Threatened (IUCN 3.1)

Scientific classification
- Kingdom: Plantae
- Clade: Embryophytes
- Clade: Tracheophytes
- Clade: Angiosperms
- Clade: Eudicots
- Clade: Asterids
- Order: Ericales
- Family: Primulaceae
- Genus: Geissanthus
- Species: G. pichinchae

Binomial name
- Geissanthus pichinchae Mez

Species of flowering plant

Geissanthus pichinchae is a species of flowering plant in the family Primulaceae. It is endemic to Ecuador.
