= Geissanthus ecuadorensis =

Conservation status
- Least Concern (IUCN 3.1)

Scientific classification
- Kingdom: Plantae
- Clade: Embryophytes
- Clade: Tracheophytes
- Clade: Angiosperms
- Clade: Eudicots
- Clade: Asterids
- Order: Ericales
- Family: Primulaceae
- Genus: Geissanthus
- Species: G. ecuadorensis

Binomial name
- Geissanthus ecuadorensis Mez

Species of tree

Geissanthus ecuadorensis is a species of tree in the family Primulaceae. It is native to Ecuador.
