= Pitcairnia riparia =

Scientific classification
- Kingdom: Plantae
- Clade: Embryophytes
- Clade: Tracheophytes
- Clade: Spermatophytes
- Clade: Angiosperms
- Clade: Monocots
- Clade: Commelinids
- Order: Poales
- Family: Bromeliaceae
- Genus: Pitcairnia
- Species: P. riparia

Binomial name
- Pitcairnia riparia Mez

Synonyms
- Heterotypic Synonyms: Pitcairnia erratica L.B.Sm.

Species of flowering plant

Pitcairnia riparia is a species of flowering plant in the family Bromeliaceae. This species is native to Bolivia and Ecuador.
