= Werauhia paupera =

Conservation status
- Vulnerable (IUCN 3.1)

Scientific classification
- Kingdom: Plantae
- Clade: Embryophytes
- Clade: Tracheophytes
- Clade: Spermatophytes
- Clade: Angiosperms
- Clade: Monocots
- Clade: Commelinids
- Order: Poales
- Family: Bromeliaceae
- Genus: Werauhia
- Species: W. paupera

Binomial name
- Werauhia paupera (Mez & Sodiro) J.R.Grant

Synonyms
- Homotypic Synonyms: Thecophyllum pauperum Mez & Sodiro; Vriesea paupera (Mez & Sodiro) L.B.Sm. & Pittendr.

Species of flowering plant

Werauhia paupera is a species of flowering plant in the family Bromeliaceae. It is native to Colombia and Ecuador. Its natural habitats are subtropical or tropical moist lowland forests and subtropical or tropical moist montane forests. It is threatened by habitat loss.
