= Werauhia camptoclada =

Conservation status
- Vulnerable (IUCN 3.1)

Scientific classification
- Kingdom: Plantae
- Clade: Embryophytes
- Clade: Tracheophytes
- Clade: Spermatophytes
- Clade: Angiosperms
- Clade: Monocots
- Clade: Commelinids
- Order: Poales
- Family: Bromeliaceae
- Genus: Werauhia
- Species: W. camptoclada

Binomial name
- Werauhia camptoclada (Mez & Wercklé) J.F.Morales

Synonyms
- Homotypic Synonyms: Vriesea camptoclada Mez & Wercklé

Species of flowering plant

Werauhia camptoclada is a species of flowering plant in the family Bromeliaceae. This species is native to Costa Rica and Panama.
