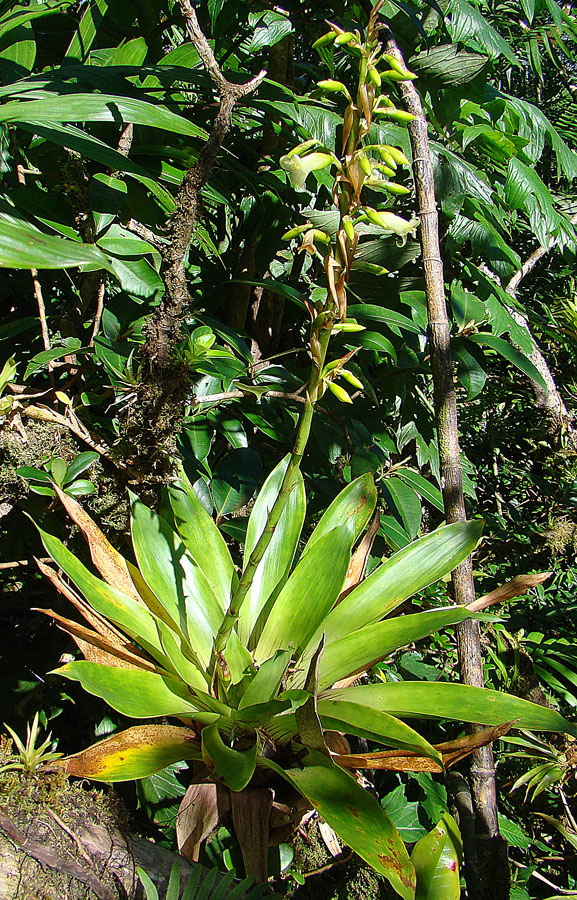

Scientific classification
- Kingdom: Plantae
- Clade: Embryophytes
- Clade: Tracheophytes
- Clade: Spermatophytes
- Clade: Angiosperms
- Clade: Monocots
- Clade: Commelinids
- Order: Poales
- Family: Bromeliaceae
- Genus: Werauhia
- Species: W. pedicellata

Binomial name
- Werauhia pedicellata (Mez & Wercklé) J.R.Grant

Synonyms
- Homotypic Synonyms: Thecophyllum pedicellatum Mez & Wercklé; Vriesea pedicellata (Mez & Wercklé) L.B.Sm. & Pittendr.; Heterotypic Synonyms: Thecophyllum turbinatum Mez & Wercklé; Thecophyllum violascens Mez & Wercklé; Vriesea turbinata (Mez & Wercklé) L.B.Sm. & Pittendr.; Vriesea violascens (Mez & Wercklé) L.B.Sm. & Pittendr.

= Werauhia pedicellata =

Species of flowering plant

Werauhia pedicellata is a species of flowering plant in the family Bromeliaceae. This species is native to Costa Rica, Honduras, Nicaragua, and Panama.
