= Werauhia vittata =

Scientific classification
- Kingdom: Plantae
- Clade: Embryophytes
- Clade: Tracheophytes
- Clade: Spermatophytes
- Clade: Angiosperms
- Clade: Monocots
- Clade: Commelinids
- Order: Poales
- Family: Bromeliaceae
- Genus: Werauhia
- Species: W. vittata

Binomial name
- Werauhia vittata (Mez & Wercklé) J.R.Grant

Synonyms
- Homotypic Synonyms: Thecophyllum vittatum Mez & Wercklé; Vriesea vittata (Mez & Wercklé) L.B.Sm. & Pittendr.; Heterotypic Synonyms: Vriesea jimenezii Mez & Tonduz; Vriesea naundorffiae Rauh; Vriesea schippii L.B.Sm.

Species of flowering plant

Werauhia vittata is a species of flowering plant in the family Bromeliaceae. This species is native to Belize, Costa Rica, Ecuador, Nicaragua, and Panama.
