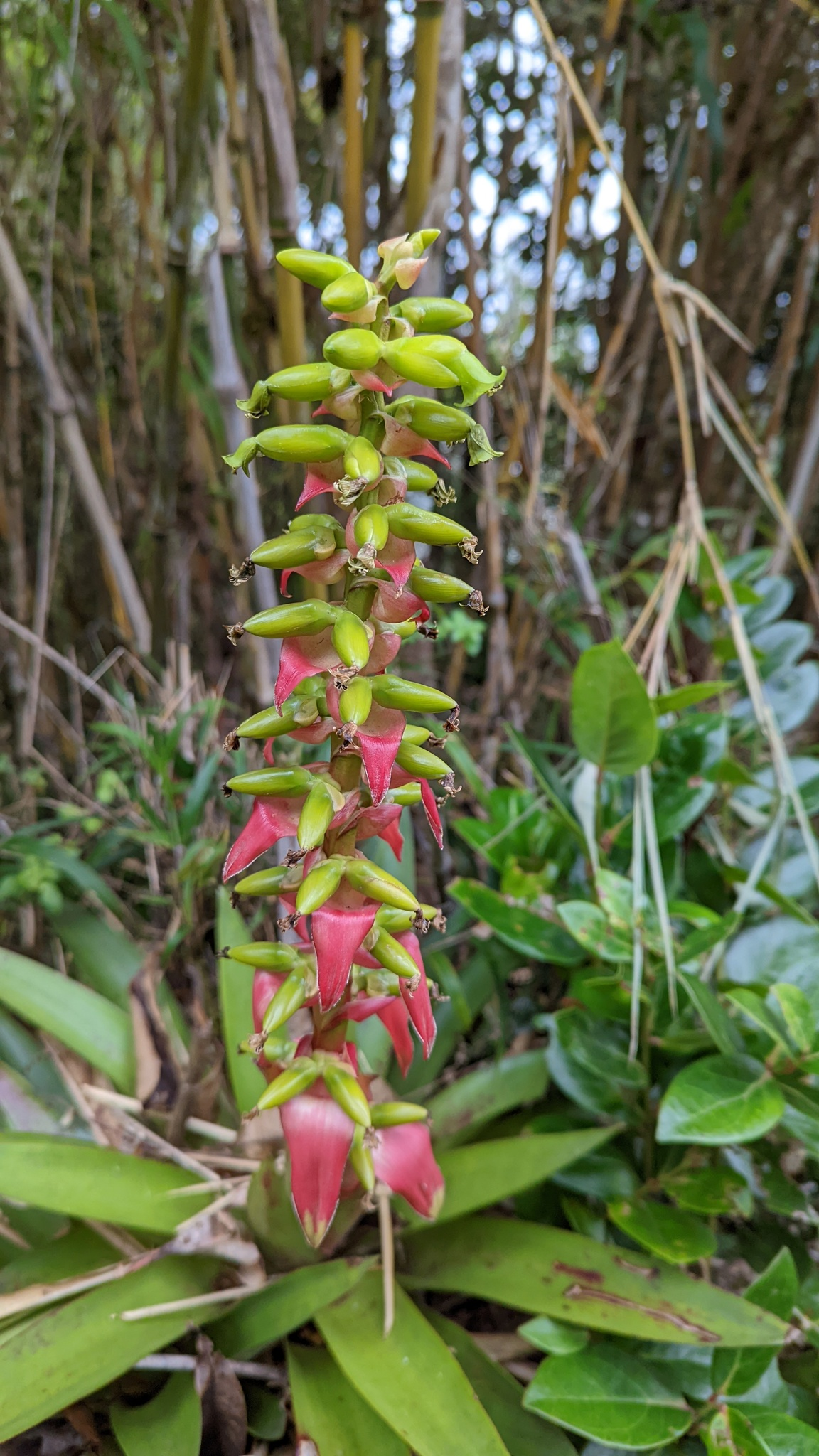

Scientific classification
- Kingdom: Plantae
- Clade: Embryophytes
- Clade: Tracheophytes
- Clade: Spermatophytes
- Clade: Angiosperms
- Clade: Monocots
- Clade: Commelinids
- Order: Poales
- Family: Bromeliaceae
- Genus: Werauhia
- Species: W. ororiensis

Binomial name
- Werauhia ororiensis (Mez) J.R.Grant

Synonyms
- Homotypic Synonyms: Guzmania ororiensis Mez; Thecophyllum ororiense (Mez) Mez; Vriesea ororiensis (Mez) L.B.Sm. & Pittendr.; Heterotypic Synonyms: Thecophyllum crassiflorum Mez & Wercklé; Thecophyllum cylindraceum Suess. & R.Goepp.; Thecophyllum irazuense Mez & Wercklé; Thecophyllum kupperi Suess. & R.Goepp.; Thecophyllum standleyi L.B.Sm.; Vriesea crassiflora (Mez & Wercklé) L.B.Sm. & Pittendr.; Vriesea cylindracea (Suess. & R.Goepp.) L.B.Sm. & Pittendr.; Vriesea irazuensis (Mez & Wercklé) L.B.Sm. & Pittendr.; Vriesea kupperi (Suess. & R.Goepp.) L.B.Sm. & Pittendr.; Vriesea standleyi (L.B.Sm.) L.B.Sm. & Pittendr.

= Werauhia ororiensis =

Species of plant

Werauhia ororiensis is a species of flowering plant in the family Bromeliaceae. This species is native to Costa Rica and Panama.
