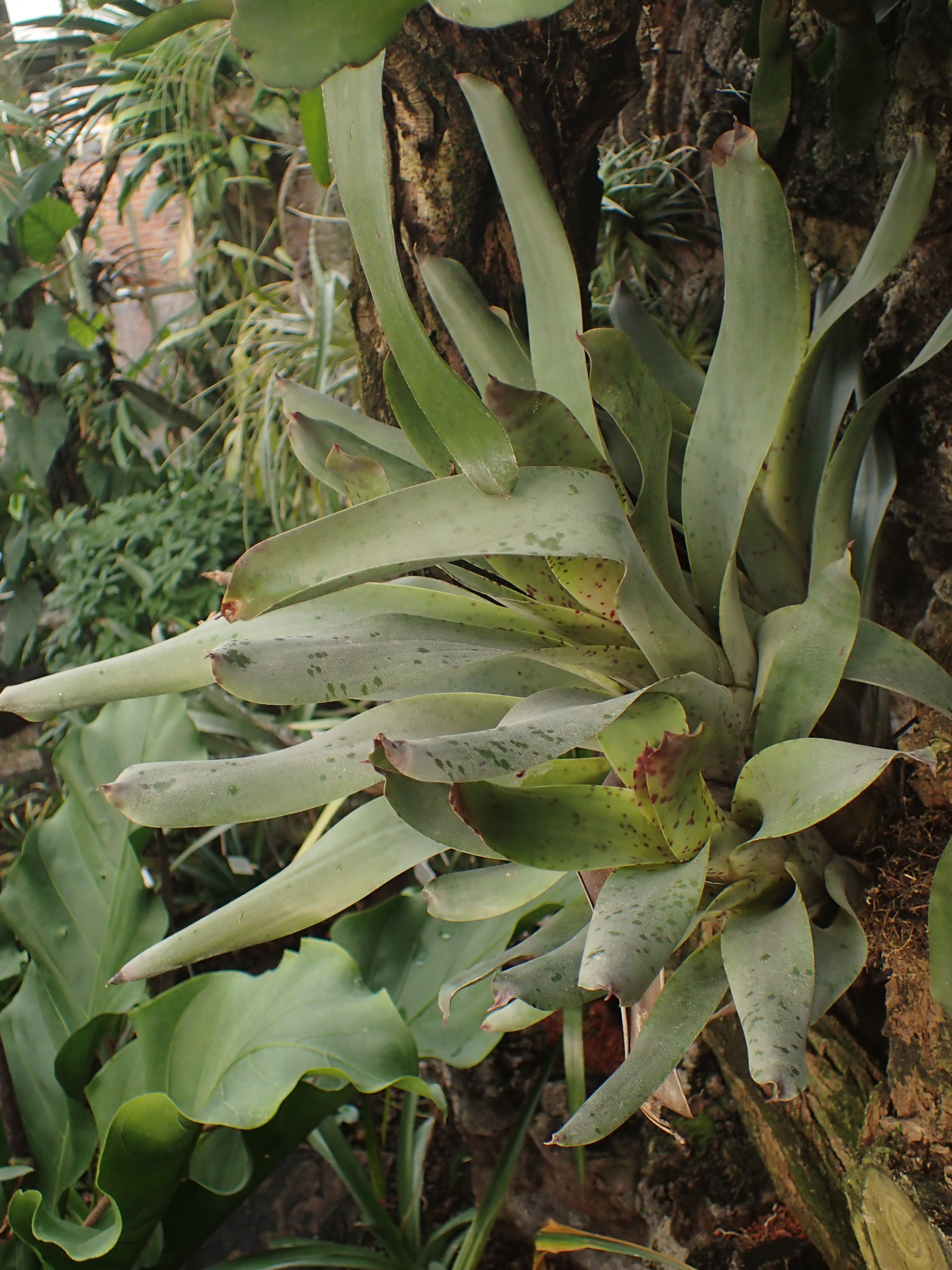

Scientific classification
- Kingdom: Plantae
- Clade: Embryophytes
- Clade: Tracheophytes
- Clade: Spermatophytes
- Clade: Angiosperms
- Clade: Monocots
- Clade: Commelinids
- Order: Poales
- Family: Bromeliaceae
- Genus: Vriesea
- Species: V. pardalina

Binomial name
- Vriesea pardalina Mez

= Vriesea pardalina =

Species of flowering plant

Vriesea pardalina is a species of flowering plant in the family Bromeliaceae. This species is native to Brazil.
