= Vriesea neoglutinosa =

Scientific classification
- Kingdom: Plantae
- Clade: Embryophytes
- Clade: Tracheophytes
- Clade: Spermatophytes
- Clade: Angiosperms
- Clade: Monocots
- Clade: Commelinids
- Order: Poales
- Family: Bromeliaceae
- Genus: Vriesea
- Species: V. neoglutinosa

Binomial name
- Vriesea neoglutinosa Mez

Synonyms
- Homotypic Synonyms: Tillandsia glutinosa Mart. ex Schult. & Schult.f.; Vriesea glutinosa (Mart. ex Schult. & Schult.f.) Wawra

Species of flowering plant

Vriesea neoglutinosa is a species of flowering plant in the family Bromeliaceae. This species is endemic to Brazil.
