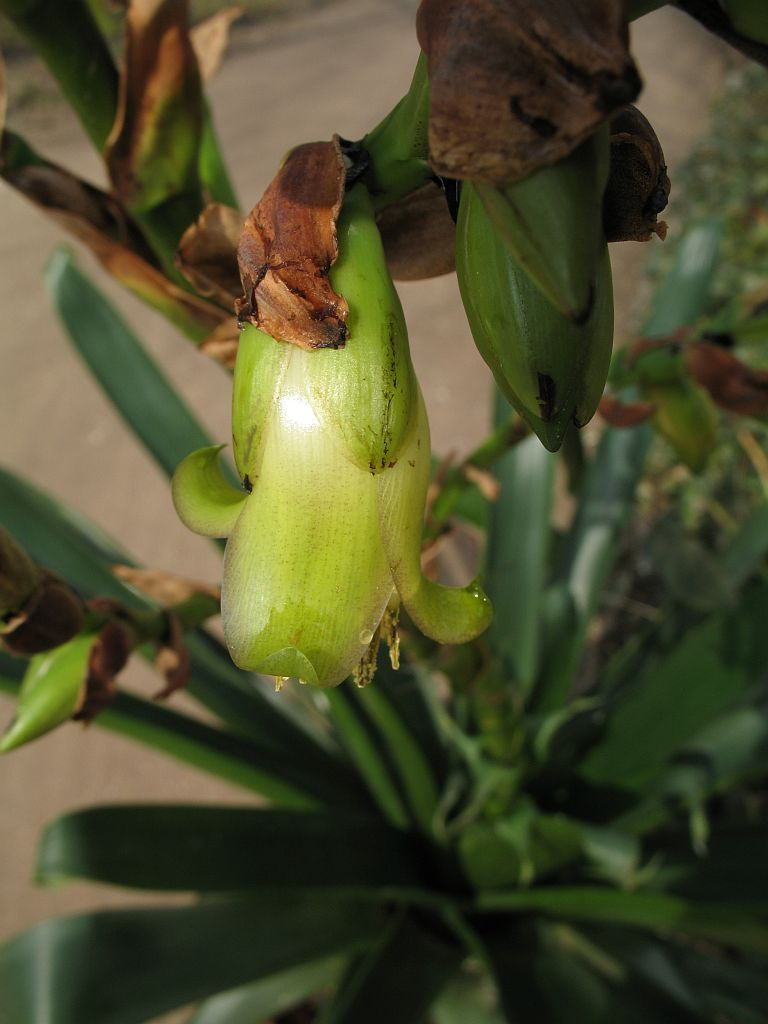

Scientific classification
- Kingdom: Plantae
- Clade: Embryophytes
- Clade: Tracheophytes
- Clade: Spermatophytes
- Clade: Angiosperms
- Clade: Monocots
- Clade: Commelinids
- Order: Poales
- Family: Bromeliaceae
- Genus: Werauhia
- Species: W. werckleana

Binomial name
- Werauhia werckleana (Mez) J.R.Grant

Synonyms
- Homotypic Synonyms: Vriesea werckleana Mez; Heterotypic Synonyms: Vriesea breedloveana L.B.Sm.; Vriesea cornus-cervi Rohweder; Werauhia breedloveana (L.B.Sm.) J.R.Grant; Werauhia cornus-cervi (Rohweder) J.R.Grant

= Werauhia werckleana =

Species of flowering plant

Werauhia werckleana is a species of flowering plant in the family Bromeliaceae. This bromiliad is native to Costa Rica, El Salvador, Guatemala, Honduras, Mexico, Nicaragua, and Panama.
