= Werauhia graminifolia =

Scientific classification
- Kingdom: Plantae
- Clade: Embryophytes
- Clade: Tracheophytes
- Clade: Spermatophytes
- Clade: Angiosperms
- Clade: Monocots
- Clade: Commelinids
- Order: Poales
- Family: Bromeliaceae
- Genus: Werauhia
- Species: W. graminifolia

Binomial name
- Werauhia graminifolia (Mez & Wercklé) J.R.Grant

Synonyms
- Homotypic Synonyms: Vriesea graminifolia Mez & Wercklé

Species of flowering plant

Werauhia graminifolia is a species of flowering plant in the famiy Bromeliaceae. This species is native to Costa Rica, Guatemala, Nicaragua, and Panama.
