= Vriesea clausseniana =

Scientific classification
- Kingdom: Plantae
- Clade: Tracheophytes
- Clade: Angiosperms
- Clade: Monocots
- Clade: Commelinids
- Order: Poales
- Family: Bromeliaceae
- Genus: Vriesea
- Species: V. clausseniana

Binomial name
- Vriesea clausseniana (Baker) Mez

Synonyms
- Tillandsia clausseniana Baker

Species of plant

Vriesea clausseniana is a plant species of flowering plant in the Bromeliaceae family. It is endemic to Brazil.
