= Werauhia balanophora =

Scientific classification
- Kingdom: Plantae
- Clade: Embryophytes
- Clade: Tracheophytes
- Clade: Spermatophytes
- Clade: Angiosperms
- Clade: Monocots
- Clade: Commelinids
- Order: Poales
- Family: Bromeliaceae
- Genus: Werauhia
- Species: W. balanophora

Binomial name
- Werauhia balanophora (Mez) J.R. Grant

Synonyms
- Homotypic Synonyms: Guzmania balanophora Mez; Thecophyllum balanophorum (Mez) Mez; Vriesea balanophora (Mez) L.B.Sm. & Pittendr.; Heterotypic Synonyms: Thecophyllum balanophorum var. subpictum Suess.; Thecophyllum lineatum Mez & Wercklé; Vriesea lineata (Mez & Wercklé) L.B.Sm. & Pittendr.

Species of flowering plant

Werauhia balanophora is a species of flowering plant in the family Bromeliaceae. This bromiliad is native to Colombia, Costa Rica, and Honduras.
