= Vriesea drepanocarpa =

Scientific classification
- Kingdom: Plantae
- Clade: Tracheophytes
- Clade: Angiosperms
- Clade: Monocots
- Clade: Commelinids
- Order: Poales
- Family: Bromeliaceae
- Genus: Vriesea
- Species: V. drepanocarpa

Binomial name
- Vriesea drepanocarpa (Baker) Mez

Synonyms
- Tillandsia drepanocarpa Baker; Tillandsia pabstiana E.Pereira; Vriesea dusenii L.B.Sm.

Species of plant

Vriesea drepanocarpa is a species of flowering plant in the Bromeliaceae family. It is endemic to Brazil.
