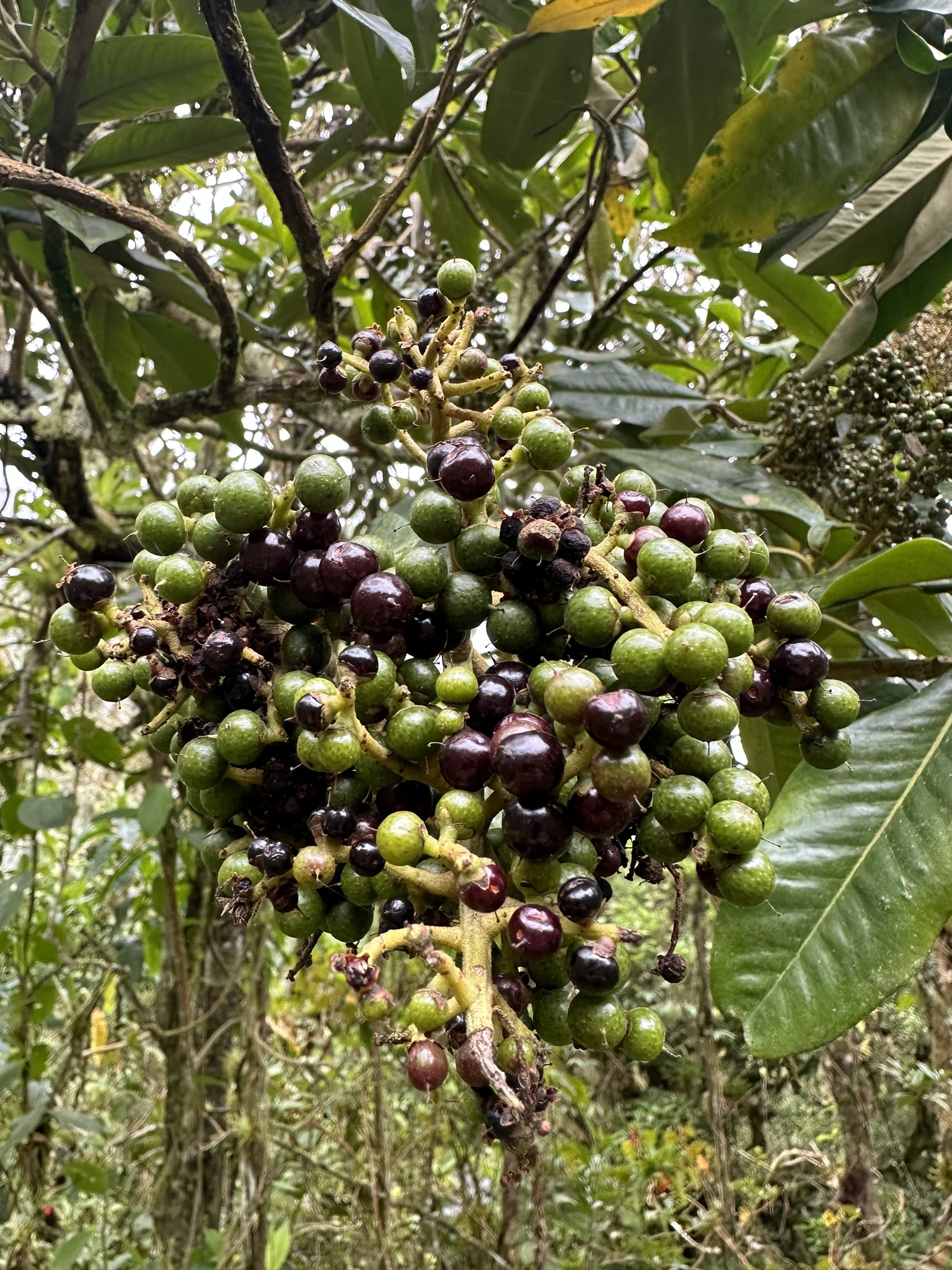
- Geissanthus bogotensis in Colombia

Scientific classification
- Kingdom: Plantae
- Clade: Embryophytes
- Clade: Tracheophytes
- Clade: Spermatophytes
- Clade: Angiosperms
- Clade: Eudicots
- Clade: Asterids
- Order: Ericales
- Family: Primulaceae
- Subfamily: Myrsinoideae
- Genus: Geissanthus; Hook.f. (1876)

Species
- 52; see text

= Geissanthus =

Genus of flowering plants

Geissanthus is a genus of shrubs and trees in the family Primulaceae. There are 52 species distributed in Panama and tropical South America, with 25 of them in forests of the Andes.

== Species ==
52 species are accepted.

- Geissanthus abditus J.F.Macbr.
- Geissanthus ambiguus (Mart.) G.Agostini
- Geissanthus andinus Mez
- Geissanthus angustiflorus Cuatrec.
- Geissanthus argutus (Kunth) Mez
- Geissanthus bangii Rusby
- Geissanthus barraganus Cuatrec.
- Geissanthus betancurii Pipoly
- Geissanthus bogotensis Mez
- Geissanthus bolivianus Britton
- Geissanthus callejasii Pipoly
- Geissanthus carchianus (Lundell) Ricketson & Pipoly
- Geissanthus cestrifolius (Kunth) Mez
- Geissanthus challuayacus Pipoly
- Geissanthus cogolloi Pipoly
- Geissanthus dentatus (Ruiz & Pav.) J.F.Macbr.
- Geissanthus durifolius (Kunth) Mez
- Geissanthus ecuadorensis Mez
- Geissanthus fallenae Lundell
- Geissanthus floccosus Mez
- Geissanthus floribundus Mez
- Geissanthus fragrans Mez
- Geissanthus francoae Pipoly
- Geissanthus furfuraceus Mez
- Geissanthus glaber Mez
- Geissanthus goudotianus Mez
- Geissanthus haenkeanus Mez
- Geissanthus kalbreyeri Mez
- Geissanthus lehmannii Mez
- Geissanthus lepidotus (Kunth) Mez
- Geissanthus longistamineus (A.C.Sm.) Pipoly
- Geissanthus longistylus (Cuatrec.) G.Agostini
- Geissanthus mameicillo (Schltdl.) Mez
- Geissanthus mezianus G.Agostini
- Geissanthus multiflorus Mez
- Geissanthus myrianthus (Mansf.) G.Agostini
- Geissanthus occidentalis Cuatrec.
- Geissanthus pentlandii Mez
- Geissanthus perpuncticulosus (Lundell) Pipoly
- Geissanthus peruvianus (A.DC.) Mez
- Geissanthus pichinchae Mez
- Geissanthus pinchinchana (Lundell) Pipoly
- Geissanthus pyramidatus (Mez) G.Agostini
- Geissanthus quindiensis Mez
- Geissanthus sararensis Cuatrec.
- Geissanthus scrobiculatus (Cuatrec.) Pipoly
- Geissanthus serrulatus (Willd. ex Roem. & Schult.) Mez
- Geissanthus sessiliflorus A.C.Sm.
- Geissanthus sodiroanus Mez
- Geissanthus spectabilis Pipoly
- Geissanthus submembranaceus Mez
- Geissanthus vanderwerffii Pipoly
- Geissanthus zakii (Pipoly) Ricketson & Pipoly
