= Werauhia latissima =

Scientific classification
- Kingdom: Plantae
- Clade: Embryophytes
- Clade: Tracheophytes
- Clade: Spermatophytes
- Clade: Angiosperms
- Clade: Monocots
- Clade: Commelinids
- Order: Poales
- Family: Bromeliaceae
- Genus: Werauhia
- Species: W. latissima

Binomial name
- Werauhia latissima (Mez & Wercklé) J.R.Grant

Synonyms
- Homotypic Synonyms: Thecophyllum latissimum Mez & Wercklé; Vriesea latissima (Mez & Wercklé) L.B.Sm. & Pittendr.; Heterotypic Synonyms: Thecophyllum discolor Mez & Wercklé; Vriesea discolor (Mez & Wercklé) L.B.Sm. & Pittendr.; Vriesea ranifera L.B.Sm.

Species of flowering plant

Werauhia latissima is a species of flowering plant in the family Bromeliaceae. This species is native to Costa Rica and Panama.
