= Vriesea laxa =

Scientific classification
- Kingdom: Plantae
- Clade: Embryophytes
- Clade: Tracheophytes
- Clade: Spermatophytes
- Clade: Angiosperms
- Clade: Monocots
- Clade: Commelinids
- Order: Poales
- Family: Bromeliaceae
- Genus: Vriesea
- Species: V. laxa

Binomial name
- Vriesea laxa Mez

Synonyms
- Homotypic Synonyms: Tillandsia laxa Griseb.

Species of flowering plant

Vriesea laxa is a species of flowering plant in the family Bromeliaceae. This species is endemic to Venezuela.
