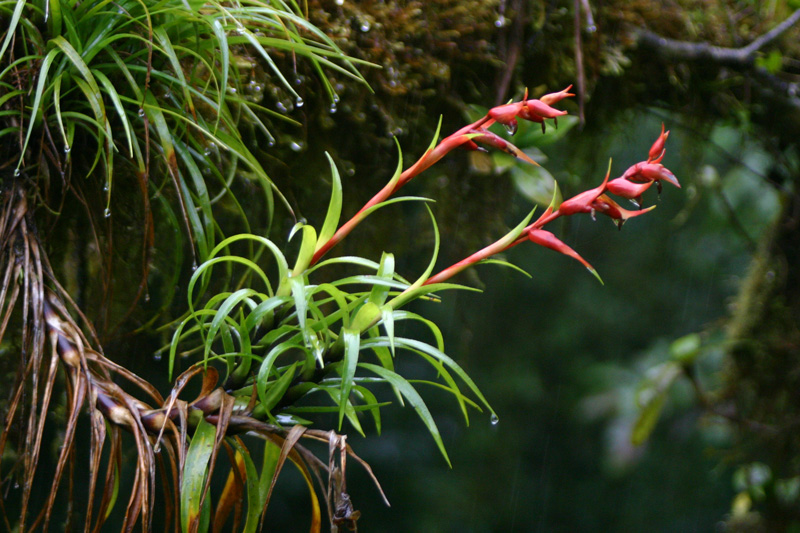
- W. insignis in Monteverde, Costa Rica

Conservation status
- Least Concern (IUCN 3.1)

Scientific classification
- Kingdom: Plantae
- Clade: Embryophytes
- Clade: Tracheophytes
- Clade: Spermatophytes
- Clade: Angiosperms
- Clade: Monocots
- Clade: Commelinids
- Order: Poales
- Family: Bromeliaceae
- Genus: Werauhia
- Species: W. insignis

Binomial name
- Werauhia insignis (Mez) W.Till, Barfuss & M.R.Samuel

Synonyms
- Homotypic Synonyms: Guzmania insignis Mez; Pepinia insignis É.Morren ex Baker; Thecophyllum insigne (Mez) Mez; Tillandsia insignis (Mez) L.B.Sm. & Pittendr.

= Werauhia insignis =

Species of epiphyte

Werauhia insignis is a species of flowering plant in the family Bromeliaceae. It is an epiphyte in the montane cloud forests of Central America distributed through native Costa Rica and Panama.
