= Puya sodiroana =

Conservation status
- Endangered (IUCN 3.1)

Scientific classification
- Kingdom: Plantae
- Clade: Embryophytes
- Clade: Tracheophytes
- Clade: Spermatophytes
- Clade: Angiosperms
- Clade: Monocots
- Clade: Commelinids
- Order: Poales
- Family: Bromeliaceae
- Genus: Puya
- Species: P. sodiroana

Binomial name
- Puya sodiroana Mez

Synonyms
- Heterotypic Synonyms: Puya gummifera Mez & Sodiro

Species of flowering plant

Puya sodiroana is a species of flowering plant in the family Bromeliaceae. It is endemic to Ecuador. Its natural habitat is subtropical or tropical moist montane forests. It is threatened by habitat loss.
