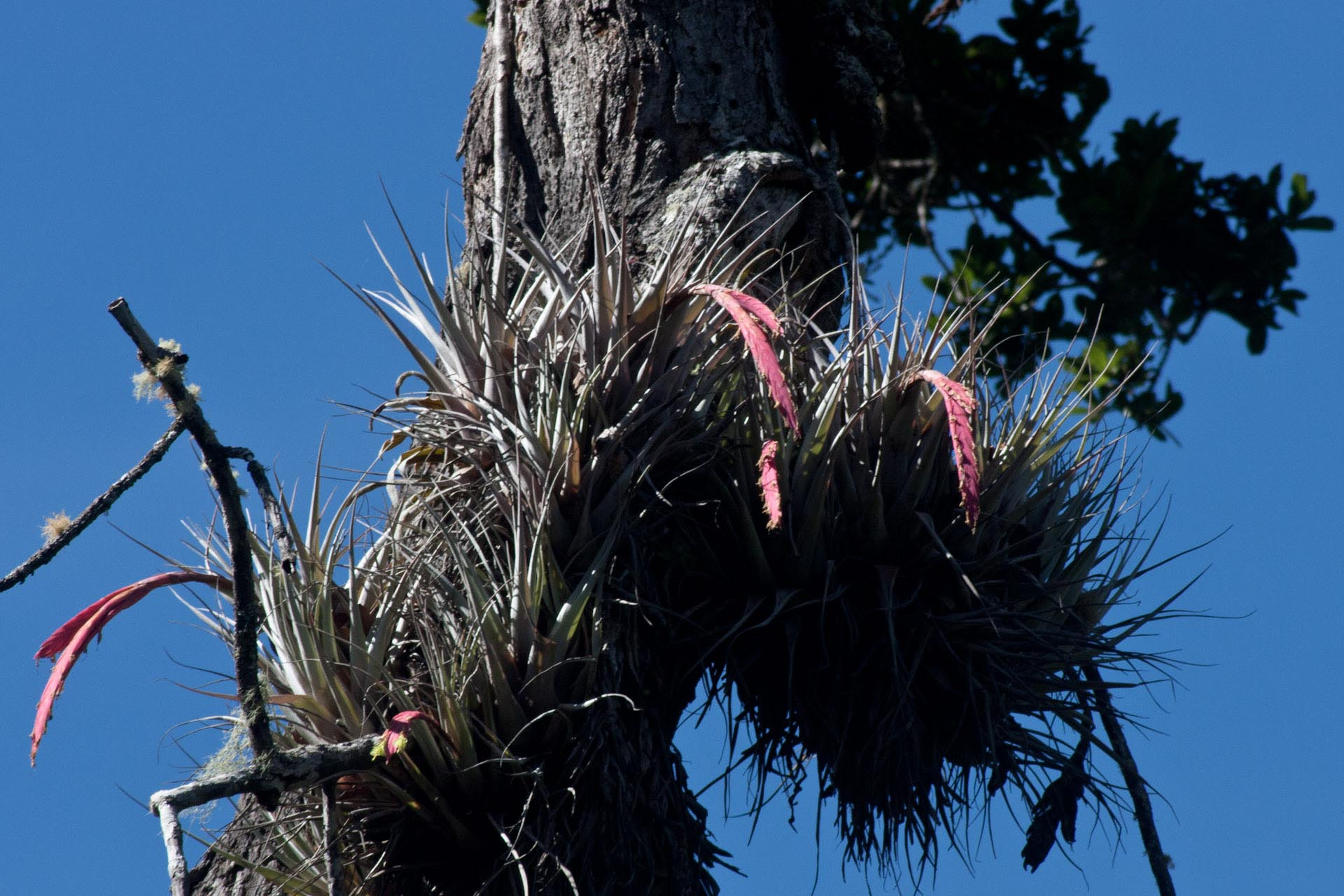

Scientific classification
- Kingdom: Plantae
- Clade: Embryophytes
- Clade: Tracheophytes
- Clade: Spermatophytes
- Clade: Angiosperms
- Clade: Monocots
- Clade: Commelinids
- Order: Poales
- Family: Bromeliaceae
- Genus: Vriesea
- Species: V. castaneobulbosa

Binomial name
- Vriesea castaneobulbosa (Mez & Wercklé) J.R.Grant

Synonyms
- Homotypic Synonyms: Tillandsia castaneobulbosa Mez & Wercklé

= Vriesea castaneobulbosa =

Species of flowering plant

Vriesea castaneobulbosa is a species of flowering plant in the family Bromeliaceae. It is endemic to Costa Rica.
