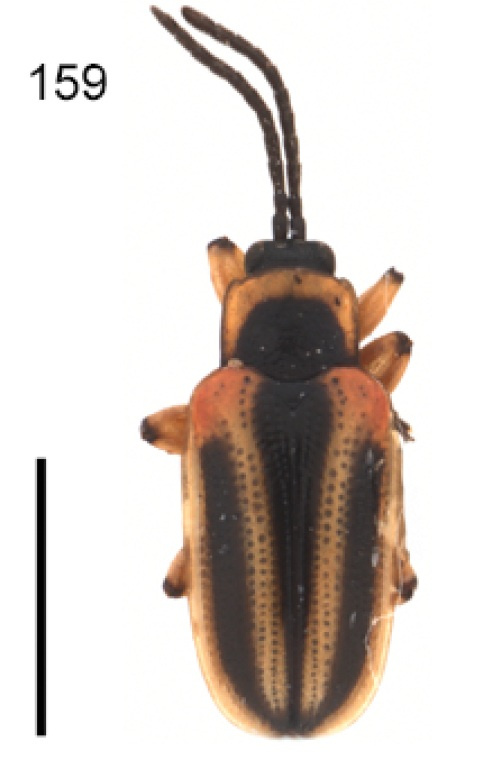

Scientific classification
- Kingdom: Animalia
- Phylum: Arthropoda
- Class: Insecta
- Order: Coleoptera
- Suborder: Polyphaga
- Infraorder: Cucujiformia
- Family: Chrysomelidae
- Genus: Cephaloleia
- Species: C. histrionica

Binomial name
- Cephaloleia histrionica Baly, 1885

= Cephaloleia histrionica =

Species of beetle

Cephaloleia histrionica is a species of beetle in the family Chrysomelidae. It is found in Costa Rica, Guatemala and Panama.

== Description ==
Adults reach a length of about 5.4–5.9 mm. The head, antennae and scutellum are black and the pronotum is yellow with a large black basal trapezoidal macula. The elytron is yellowish with a reddish humerus and black sutural and lateral vittae.

== Biology ==
Recorded host plants are Pitcairnia arcuata, Calathea lutea, Heliconia imbricata, Heliconia latispatha and Costus species.
