= Parathesis eggersiana =

Conservation status
- Critically Endangered (IUCN 3.1)

Scientific classification
- Kingdom: Plantae
- Clade: Embryophytes
- Clade: Tracheophytes
- Clade: Angiosperms
- Clade: Eudicots
- Clade: Asterids
- Order: Ericales
- Family: Primulaceae
- Genus: Parathesis
- Species: P. eggersiana

Binomial name
- Parathesis eggersiana Mez

Species of flowering plant

Parathesis eggersiana is a species of plant in the family Primulaceae. It is endemic to Ecuador.
