= Werauhia boliviana =

Scientific classification
- Kingdom: Plantae
- Clade: Tracheophytes
- Clade: Angiosperms
- Clade: Monocots
- Clade: Commelinids
- Order: Poales
- Family: Bromeliaceae
- Genus: Werauhia
- Species: W. boliviana

Binomial name
- Werauhia boliviana H.Luther

Species of flowering plant

Werauhia boliviana is a plant species in the genus Werauhia. This species is endemic to Bolivia.
