= Werauhia notata =

Scientific classification
- Kingdom: Plantae
- Clade: Tracheophytes
- Clade: Angiosperms
- Clade: Monocots
- Clade: Commelinids
- Order: Poales
- Family: Bromeliaceae
- Genus: Werauhia
- Species: W. notata

Binomial name
- Werauhia notata (L.B.Smith & Pittendrigh) J.R.Grant

Species of flowering plant

Werauhia notata is a plant species in the genus Werauhia. This species is endemic to Costa Rica.
