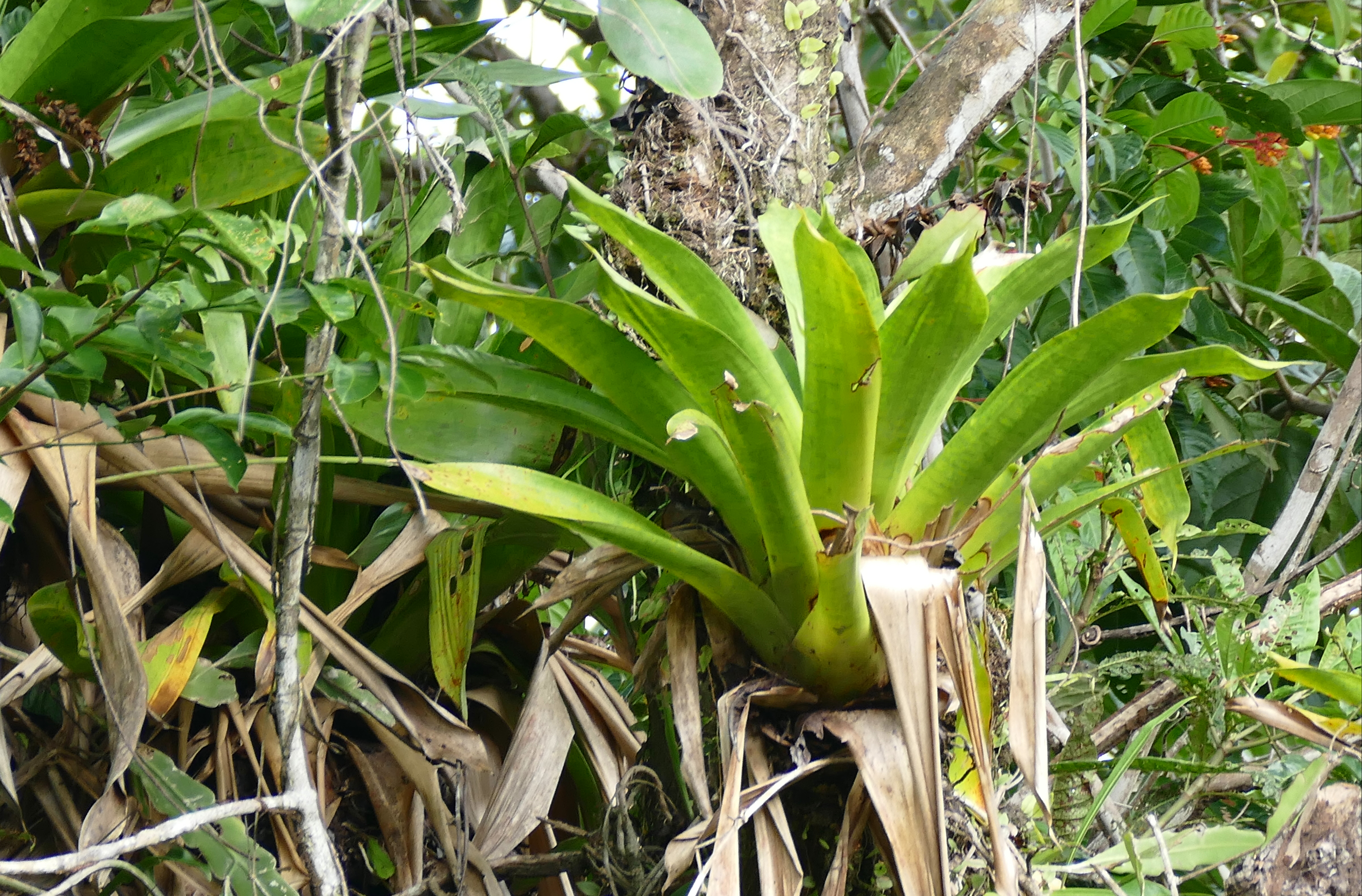

Scientific classification
- Kingdom: Plantae
- Clade: Tracheophytes
- Clade: Angiosperms
- Clade: Monocots
- Clade: Commelinids
- Order: Poales
- Family: Bromeliaceae
- Genus: Werauhia
- Species: W. gigantea

Binomial name
- Werauhia gigantea (Mart. ex Schult. & Schult.f.) J.R.Grant

= Werauhia gigantea =

Species of flowering plant

Werauhia gigantea is a species of plant in the bromeliad family Bromeliaceae. This species is native to Venezuela.
