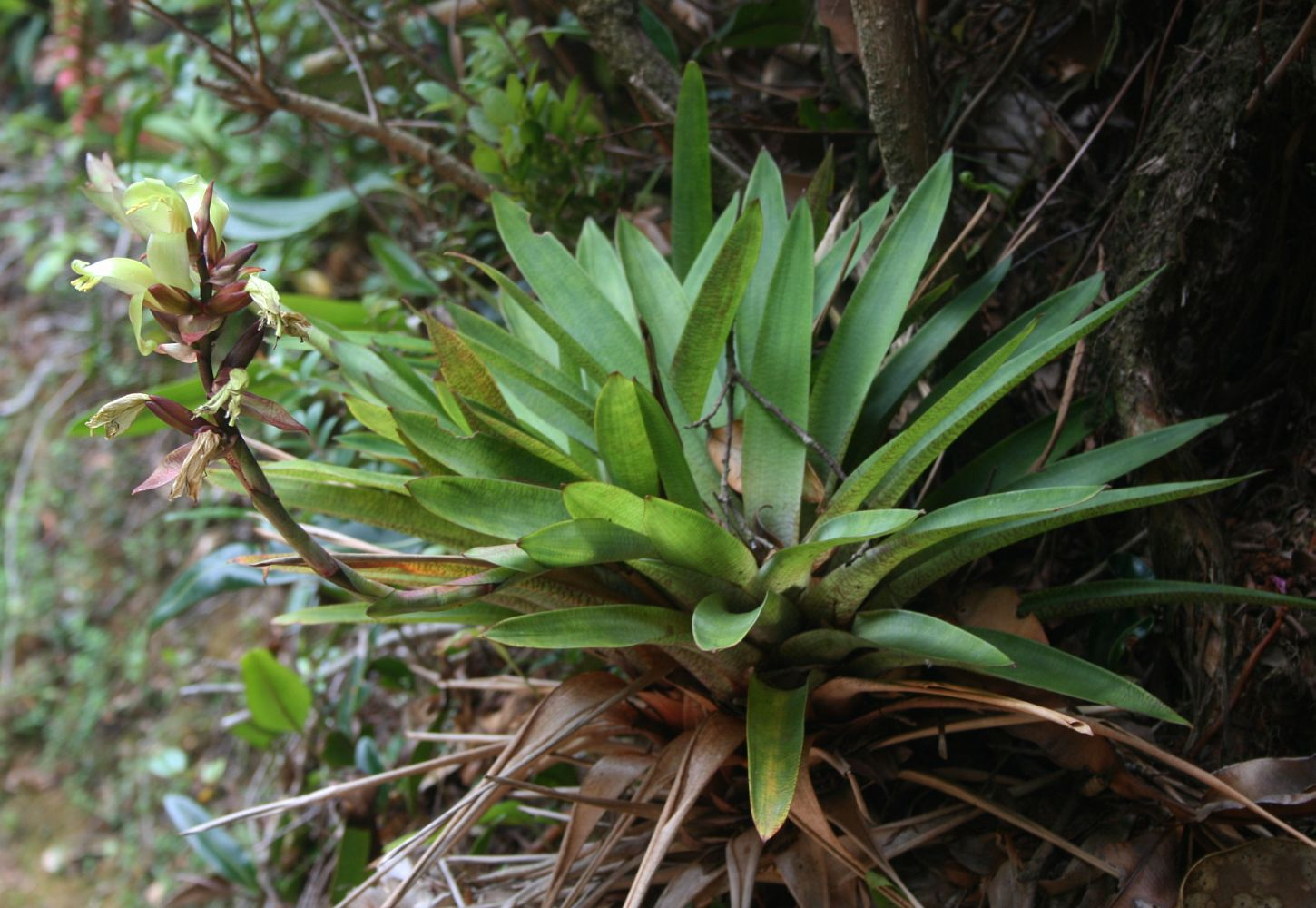
- Werauhia williamsii, Poás Volcano, Costa Rica

Scientific classification
- Kingdom: Plantae
- Clade: Tracheophytes
- Clade: Angiosperms
- Clade: Monocots
- Clade: Commelinids
- Order: Poales
- Family: Bromeliaceae
- Genus: Werauhia
- Species: W. williamsii

Binomial name
- Werauhia williamsii (L.B.Smith) J.R.Grant

Synonyms
- Vriesea williamsii L.B.Sm.; Vriesea sarcolepis L.B.Sm.

= Werauhia williamsii =

Species of flowering plant

Werauhia williamsii is a species of flowering plant in the genus Werauhia. It is a terrestrial bromeliad, native the montane forests of Costa Rica and western Panama.

It inhabits the Talamancan montane forests ecoregion, where it grows in the shrub understory of upper montane forests, from approximately 2,300 to 3,200 meters elevation.
