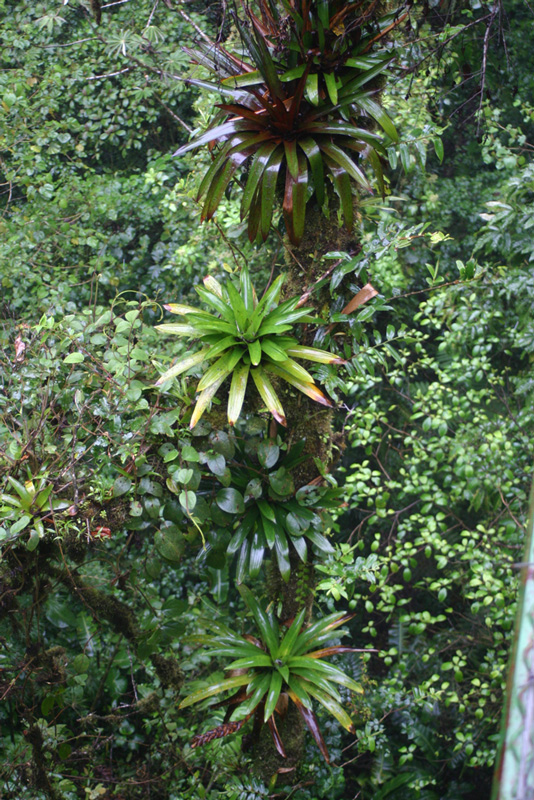
- In Monteverde, Costa Rica

Scientific classification
- Kingdom: Plantae
- Clade: Tracheophytes
- Clade: Angiosperms
- Clade: Monocots
- Clade: Commelinids
- Order: Poales
- Family: Bromeliaceae
- Subfamily: Tillandsioideae
- Genus: Werauhia; J.R.Grant

Species
- See text

= Werauhia =

Genus of plants

Werauhia is a genus of the botanical family Bromeliaceae, subfamily Tillandsioideae. The genus is named for Werner Rauh, a German botanist (1913–2000). Based on molecular evidence, a number of species previously classified within other bromeliad genera, especially Vriesea and Tillandsia, have been placed in Werauhia instead. Species in this genus are distributed across tropical regions in the Americas.. A review of bromeliad pollination suggested that Werauhia may be the bromeliad genus most strongly specialized for bat pollination

== Species ==
- Werauhia acuminata (Mez & Wercklé) J.R. Grant
- Werauhia ampla (L.B. Smith) J.R. Grant
- Werauhia anitana J.F. Morales
- Werauhia apiculata (L.B. Smith) J.R. Grant
- Werauhia attenuata (L.B. Smith & Pittendrigh) J.R. Grant
- Werauhia balanophora (Mez) J.R. Grant
- Werauhia barii (J.F. Morales) J.F. Morales
- Werauhia bicolor (L.B. Smith) J.R. Grant
- Werauhia boliviana H. Luther
- Werauhia bracteosa (Mez & Wercklé) J.R. Grant
- Werauhia broadwayi (L.B. Smith) J.R. Grant
- Werauhia brunei (Mez & Wercklé) J.R. Grant
- Werauhia burgeri (L.B. Smith) J.R. Grant
- Werauhia camptoclada (Mez & Wercklé) J.F. Morales
- Werauhia capitata (Mez & Wercklé) J.R. Grant
- Werauhia comata (Mez & Wercklé) J.R. Grant
- Werauhia cowellii (Mez & N.L. Britton) J.R. Grant
- Werauhia dalstroemii H. Luther
- Werauhia diantha (H. Luther) J.R. Grant
- Werauhia dressleri (Rauh) J.R. Grant
- Werauhia gibba (L.B. Smith) J.R. Grant
- Werauhia gigantea (Martius ex Schultes f.) J.R. Grant
- Werauhia gladioliflora (H. Wendland) J.R. Grant
- Werauhia graminifolia (Mez & Wercklé) J.R. Grant
- Werauhia greenbergii (J. Utley) J.R. Grant
- Werauhia guadelupensis (Baker) J.R. Grant
- Werauhia haberi (J.F. Morales) J.F. Morales
- Werauhia hainesiorum (L.B. Smith) J.R. Grant
- Werauhia haltonii (H. Luther) J.R. Grant
- Werauhia haplostachya (C. Wright ex Sauvalle) J.R. Grant
- Werauhia hygrometrica (André) J.R. Grant
- Werauhia insignis (Mez) W. Till, Barfuss & R. Samuel
- Werauhia jenii S. Pierce
- Werauhia kathyae (J. Utley) J.R. Grant
- Werauhia kupperiana (Suessenguth) J.R. Grant
- Werauhia latissima (Mez & Wercklé) J.R. Grant
- Werauhia laxa (Mez & Wercklé) J.R. Grant
- Werauhia leucophylla (L.B. Smith) J.R. Grant
- Werauhia luis-gomezii (J. Utley) J.R. Grant
- Werauhia lutheri S. Pierce & J.E. Aranda
- Werauhia lyman-smithii (J. Utley) J.R. Grant
- Werauhia macrantha (Mez & Wercklé) J.R. Grant
- Werauhia macrochlamys (Mez & Wercklé) J.F. Morales
- Werauhia marnier-lapostollei (L.B. Smith) J.R. Grant
- Werauhia millennia J.R. Grant
- Werauhia moralesii H. Luther
- Werauhia nephrolepis (L.B. Smith & Pittendrigh) J.R. Grant
- Werauhia noctiflorens T. Krömer, Espejo, López-Ferrari & Acebey
- Werauhia notata (L.B. Smith & Pittendrigh) J.R. Grant
- Werauhia nutans (L.B. Smith) J.R. Grant
- Werauhia ochracea (Rauh & E. Gross) J.R. Grant
- Werauhia orjuelae (L.B. Smith) J.R. Grant
- Werauhia ororiensis (Mez) J.R. Grant
- Werauhia osaensis (J.F. Morales) J.F. Morales
- Werauhia panamaensis (E. Gross & Rauh) J.R. Grant
- Werauhia paniculata (Mez & Wercklé) J.R. Grant
- Werauhia paupera (Mez & Sodiro) J.R. Grant
- Werauhia pectinata (L.B. Smith) J.R. Grant
- Werauhia pedicellata (Mez & Wercklé) J.R. Grant
- Werauhia picta (Mez & Wercklé) J.R. Grant
- Werauhia pittieri (Mez) J.R. Grant
- Werauhia proctorii Cedeño-Maldonado
- Werauhia pycnantha (L.B. Smith) J.R. Grant
- Werauhia ringens (Grisebach) J.R. Grant
- Werauhia rubra (Mez & Wercklé) J.R. Grant
- Werauhia rugosa (Mez & Wercklé) J.R. Grant
- Werauhia sanguinolenta (Linden ex Cogniaux & Marchal) J.R. Grant
- Werauhia singuliflora (Mez & Wercklé) J.R. Grant
- Werauhia sintenisii (Baker) J.R. Grant
- Werauhia stenophylla (Mez & Wercklé) J.R. Grant
- Werauhia subsecunda (Wittmack) J.R. Grant
- Werauhia tarmaensis (Rauh) J.R. Grant
- Werauhia tiquirensis (J.F. Morales) J.F. Morales
- Werauhia tonduziana (L.B. Smith) J.R. Grant
- Werauhia umbrosa (L.B. Smith) J.R. Grant
- Werauhia urbaniana (Mez) J.R. Grant
- Werauhia uxoris (Utley) J.R. Grant
- Werauhia van-hyningii (L.B. Smith) J.R. Grant
- Werauhia verrucosa (L.B. Smith) J.R. Grant
- Werauhia vietoris (J. Utley) J.R. Grant
- Werauhia viridiflora (Regel) J.R. Grant
- Werauhia viridis (Mez & Wercklé) J.R. Grant
- Werauhia vittata (Mez & Wercklé) J.R. Grant
- Werauhia vulcanicola (J.F. Morales) J.F. Morales
- Werauhia werckleana (Mez) J.R. Grant
- Werauhia williamsii (L.B. Smith) J.R. Grant
- Werauhia woodsoniana (L.B. Smith) J.R. Grant
