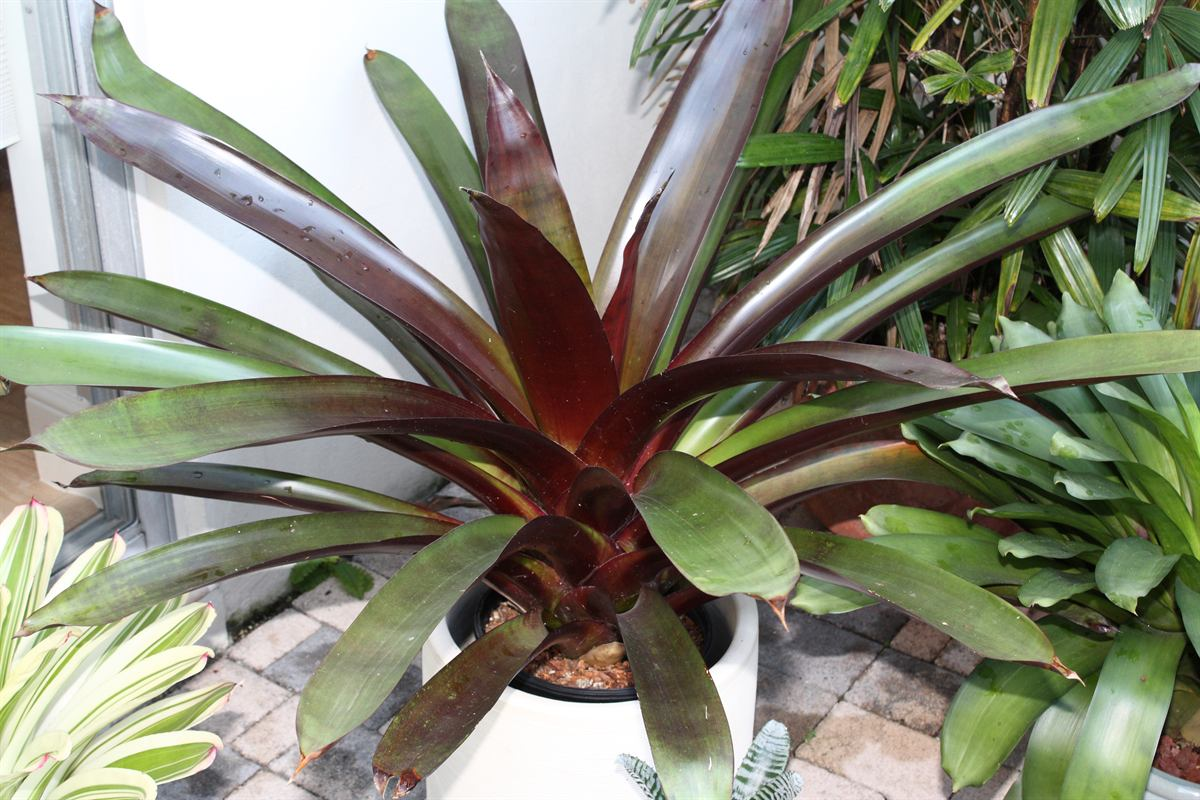

Scientific classification
- Kingdom: Plantae
- Clade: Tracheophytes
- Clade: Angiosperms
- Clade: Monocots
- Clade: Commelinids
- Order: Poales
- Family: Bromeliaceae
- Genus: Werauhia
- Species: W. sanguinolenta

Binomial name
- Werauhia sanguinolenta (Cogn. & Marchal) J.R.Grant

Synonyms
- Tillandsia sanguinolenta (Cogn. & Marchal) Baker; Vriesea sanguinolenta Cogn. & Marchal; Tillandsia ingens Mez; Vriesea alfarovii Mez; Vriesea urbaniana Harms

= Werauhia sanguinolenta =

Species of flowering plant

Werauhia sanguinolenta is a plant species in the genus Werauhia. The species is native to Colombia.

== Cultivars ==
- Werauhia 'Edna Shiigi'
