= Parathesis seibertii =

Conservation status
- Endangered (IUCN 3.1)

Scientific classification
- Kingdom: Plantae
- Clade: Tracheophytes
- Clade: Angiosperms
- Clade: Eudicots
- Clade: Asterids
- Order: Ericales
- Family: Primulaceae
- Genus: Parathesis
- Species: P. seibertii

Binomial name
- Parathesis seibertii Lundell

Synonyms
- Parathesis woodsonii Lundell

Species of flowering plant

Parathesis seibertii is a species of flowering plant in the family Primulaceae. It is endemic to Panama. It is threatened by habitat loss.
