= Geissanthus spectabilis =

Scientific classification
- Kingdom: Plantae
- Clade: Tracheophytes
- Clade: Angiosperms
- Clade: Eudicots
- Clade: Asterids
- Order: Ericales
- Family: Primulaceae
- Genus: Geissanthus
- Species: G. spectabilis

Binomial name
- Geissanthus spectabilis Pipoly

Species of plant

Geissanthus spectabilis is a species of tree in the family Primulaceae. It is endemic to Peru.
