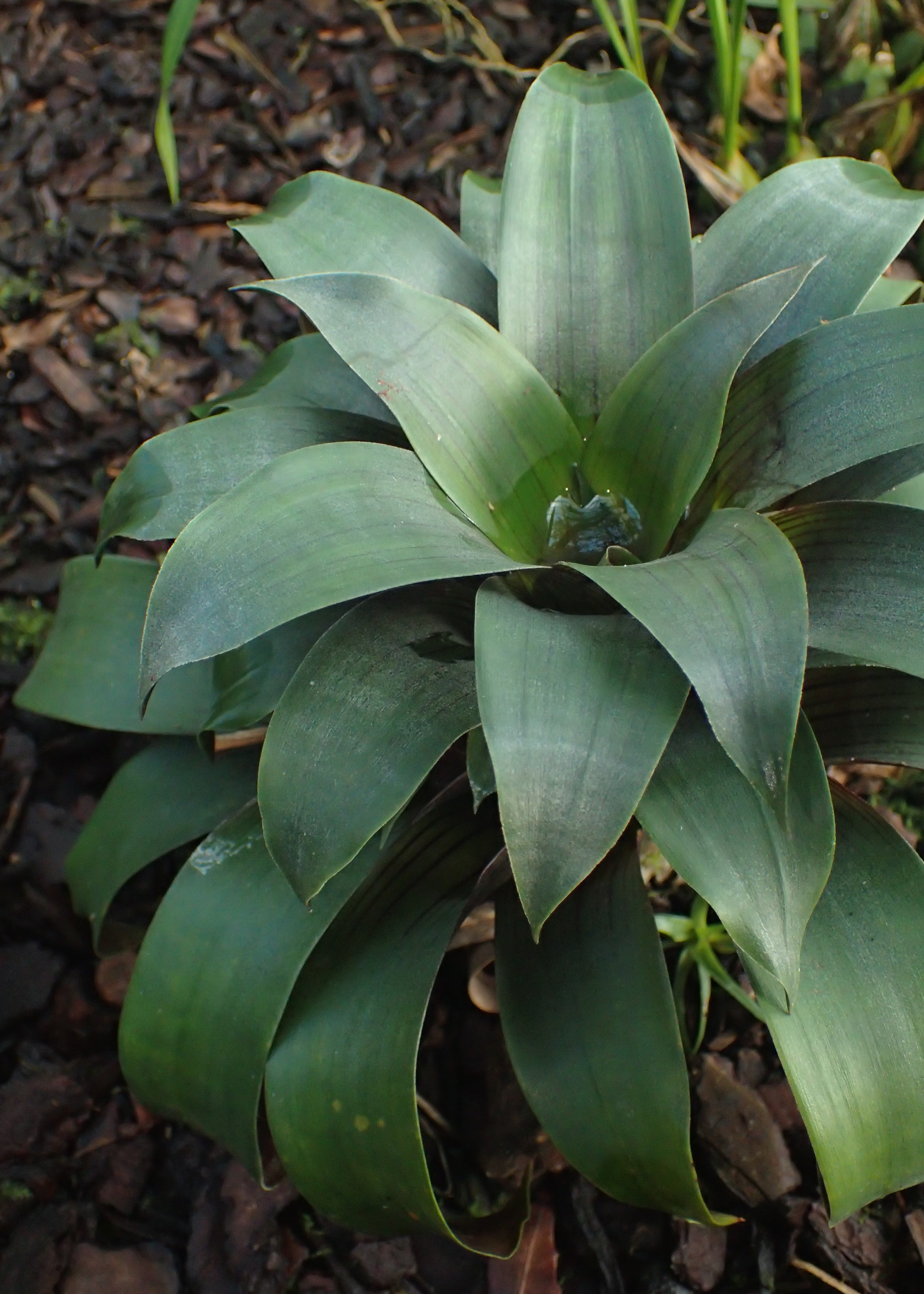

Scientific classification
- Kingdom: Plantae
- Clade: Tracheophytes
- Clade: Angiosperms
- Clade: Monocots
- Clade: Commelinids
- Order: Poales
- Family: Bromeliaceae
- Genus: Werauhia
- Species: W. marnier-lapostollei

Binomial name
- Werauhia marnier-lapostollei (L.B.Smith) J.R.Grant

= Werauhia marnier-lapostollei =

Species of flowering plant

Werauhia marnier-lapostollei is a plant species in the genus Werauhia. This species is native to Costa Rica.
