= Werauhia ringens =

Scientific classification
- Kingdom: Plantae
- Clade: Tracheophytes
- Clade: Angiosperms
- Clade: Monocots
- Clade: Commelinids
- Order: Poales
- Family: Bromeliaceae
- Genus: Werauhia
- Species: W. ringens

Binomial name
- Werauhia ringens (Griseb.) J.R.Grant

Synonyms
- Tillandsia ringens Griseb.; Vriesea ringens (Griseb.) Harms; Tillandsia chagresiana Baker; Tillandsia veitchii Baker; Vriesea veitchii É.Morren ex Baker

Species of flowering plant

Werauhia ringens is a species of flowering plant in the family Bromeliaceae. This species is native to Costa Rica and Ecuador.
