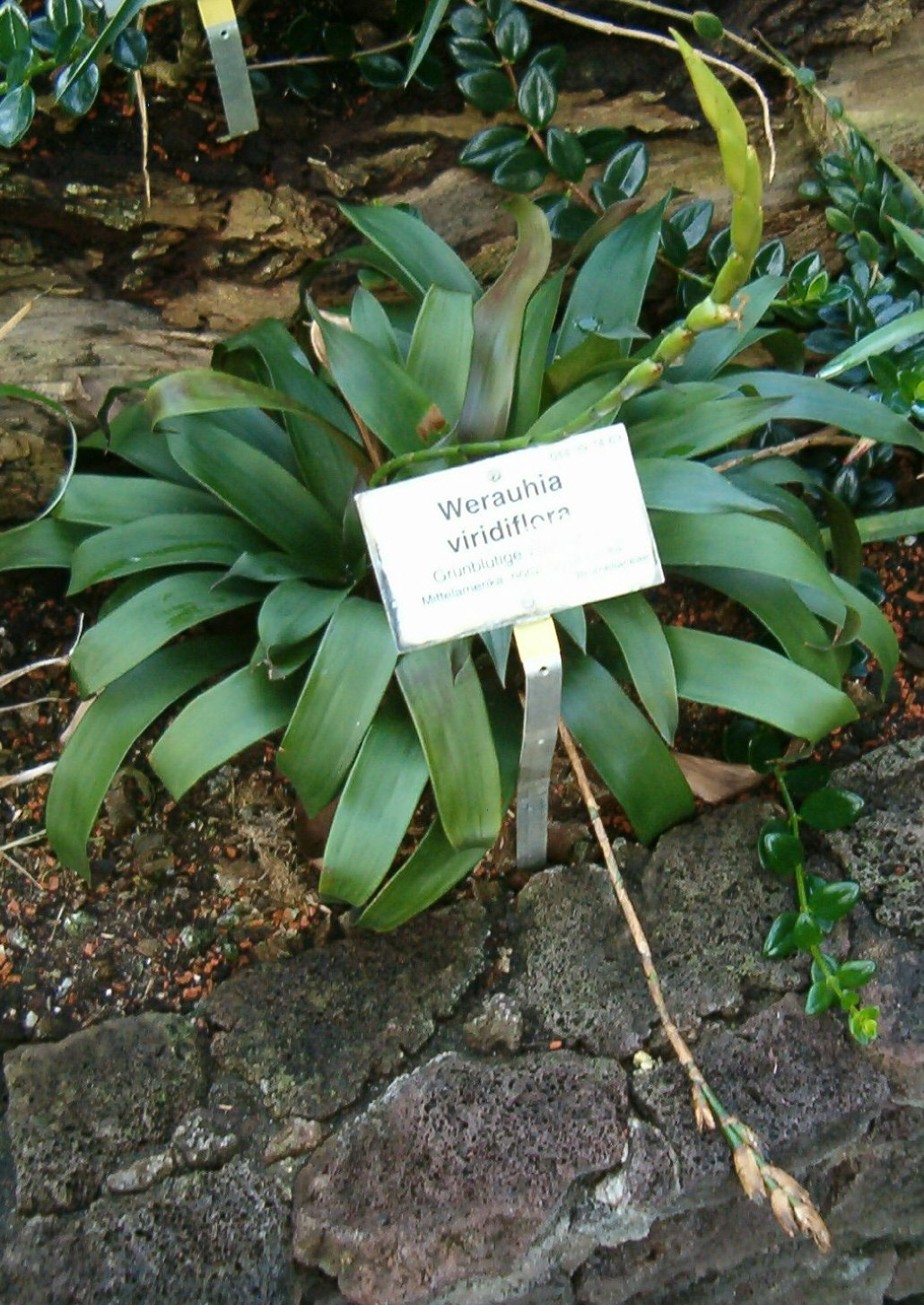

Scientific classification
- Kingdom: Plantae
- Clade: Tracheophytes
- Clade: Angiosperms
- Clade: Monocots
- Clade: Commelinids
- Order: Poales
- Family: Bromeliaceae
- Genus: Werauhia
- Species: W. viridiflora

Binomial name
- Werauhia viridiflora (Regel) J.R.Grant

= Werauhia viridiflora =

Species of flowering plant

Werauhia viridiflora is a plant species in the genus Werauhia. This species is native to Costa Rica, Venezuela and Ecuador.
