= Parathesis palaciosii =

Conservation status
- Vulnerable (IUCN 3.1)

Scientific classification
- Kingdom: Plantae
- Clade: Tracheophytes
- Clade: Angiosperms
- Clade: Eudicots
- Clade: Asterids
- Order: Ericales
- Family: Primulaceae
- Genus: Parathesis
- Species: P. palaciosii

Binomial name
- Parathesis palaciosii Pipoly

Species of flowering plant

Parathesis palaciosii is a species of plant belonging to the family Primulaceae. It is endemic to Ecuador.
