= Parathesis panamensis =

Conservation status
- Least Concern (IUCN 3.1)

Scientific classification
- Kingdom: Plantae
- Clade: Tracheophytes
- Clade: Angiosperms
- Clade: Eudicots
- Clade: Asterids
- Order: Ericales
- Family: Primulaceae
- Genus: Parathesis
- Species: P. panamensis

Binomial name
- Parathesis panamensis Lundell

Species of flowering plant

Parathesis panamensis is a species of flowering plant in the family Primulaceae. It is native to Colombia and Panama.
