= Werauhia lutheri =

Scientific classification
- Kingdom: Plantae
- Clade: Tracheophytes
- Clade: Angiosperms
- Clade: Monocots
- Clade: Commelinids
- Order: Poales
- Family: Bromeliaceae
- Genus: Werauhia
- Species: W. lutheri

Binomial name
- Werauhia lutheri S.Pierce & J.E.Aranda

Species of flowering plant

Werauhia lutheri is a plant species in the genus Werauhia. This species is endemic to Costa Rica.
