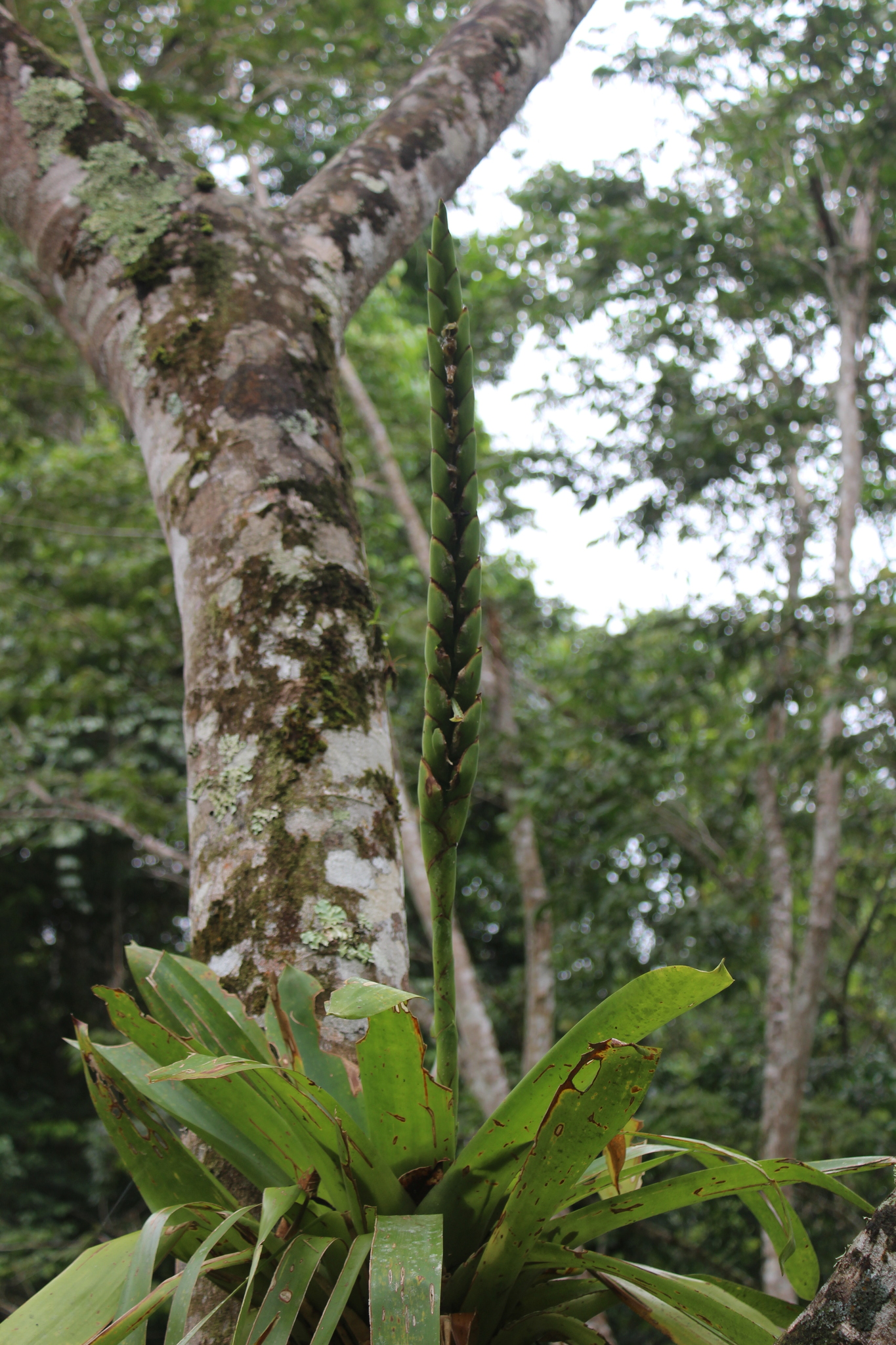

Scientific classification
- Kingdom: Plantae
- Clade: Tracheophytes
- Clade: Angiosperms
- Clade: Monocots
- Clade: Commelinids
- Order: Poales
- Family: Bromeliaceae
- Genus: Werauhia
- Species: W. gladioliflora

Binomial name
- Werauhia gladioliflora (H.Wendland) J.R.Grant

= Werauhia gladioliflora =

Species of flowering plant

Werauhia gladioliflora is a plant species in the genus Werauhia. This species is native to Bolivia, Costa Rica, Mexico, Venezuela and Ecuador.
