= Werauhia hygrometrica =

Scientific classification
- Kingdom: Plantae
- Clade: Tracheophytes
- Clade: Angiosperms
- Clade: Monocots
- Clade: Commelinids
- Order: Poales
- Family: Bromeliaceae
- Genus: Werauhia
- Species: W. hygrometrica

Binomial name
- Werauhia hygrometrica (André) J.R.Grant

Synonyms
- Caraguata hygrometrica André; Guzmania hygrometrica (André) Mez; Thecophyllum hygrometricum (André) Mez; Vriesea hygrometrica (André) L.B.Sm. & Pittendr.

Species of plant

Werauhia hygrometrica is a species of flowering plant in the Bromeliaceae family. It is native to Costa Rica, Mexico, Venezuela and Ecuador.
