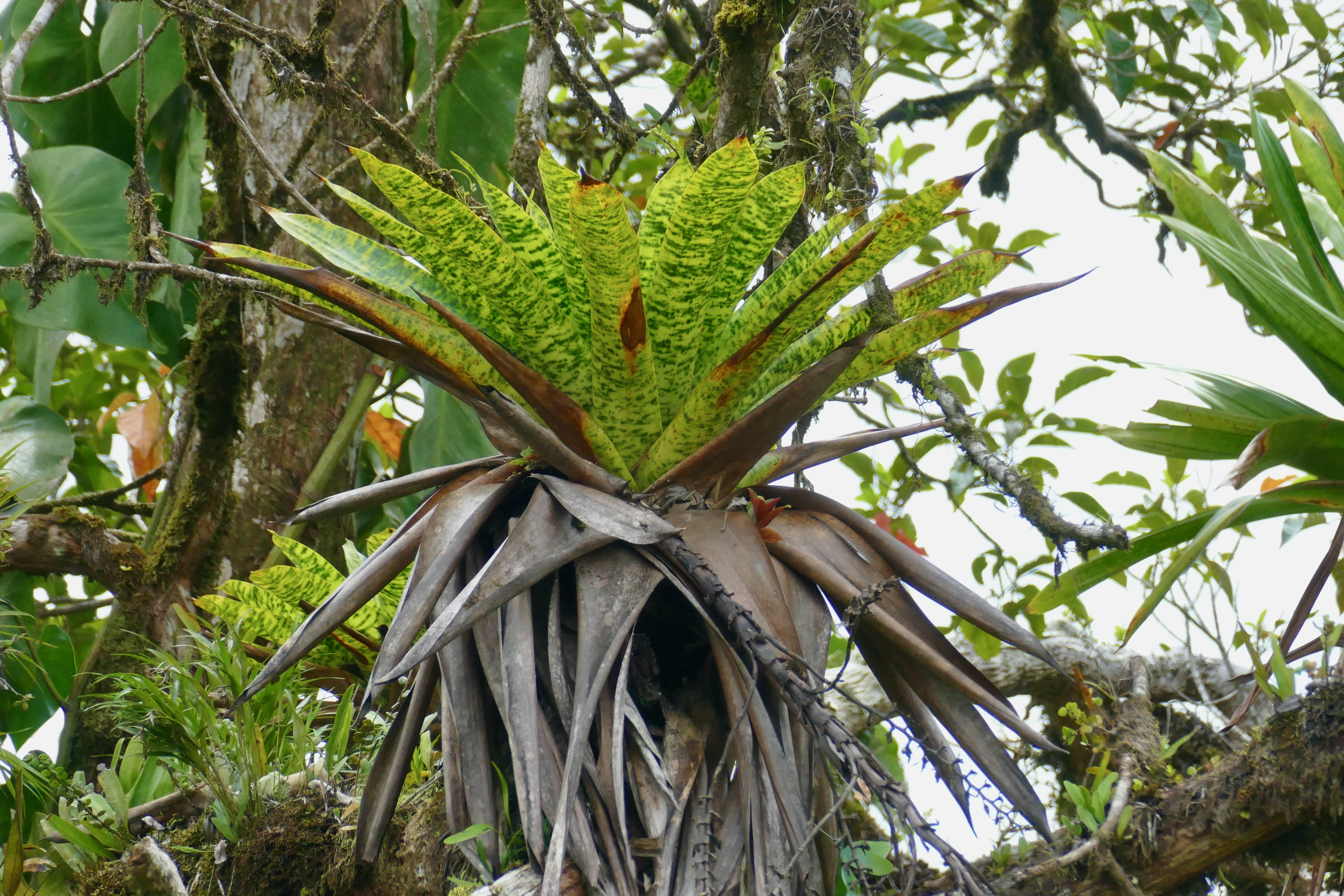
- Werauhia kupperiana

Scientific classification
- Kingdom: Plantae
- Clade: Tracheophytes
- Clade: Angiosperms
- Clade: Monocots
- Clade: Commelinids
- Order: Poales
- Family: Bromeliaceae
- Genus: Werauhia
- Species: W. kupperiana

Binomial name
- Werauhia kupperiana (Suessenguth) J.R.Grant

= Werauhia kupperiana =

Species of flowering plant

Werauhia kupperiana is a plant species in the genus Werauhia. This species is native to Costa Rica and Ecuador.

== Cultivars ==
- × Vrierauhia 'Gladys Aono'
