= Parathesis vulgata =

Conservation status
- Near Threatened (IUCN 3.1)

Scientific classification
- Kingdom: Plantae
- Clade: Tracheophytes
- Clade: Angiosperms
- Clade: Eudicots
- Clade: Asterids
- Order: Ericales
- Family: Primulaceae
- Genus: Parathesis
- Species: P. vulgata

Binomial name
- Parathesis vulgata Lundell

Species of flowering plant

Parathesis vulgata is a species of flowering plant in the family Primulaceae. It is native to El Salvador, Guatemala, Honduras, Southeast and Southwest Mexico, and Nicaragua.
