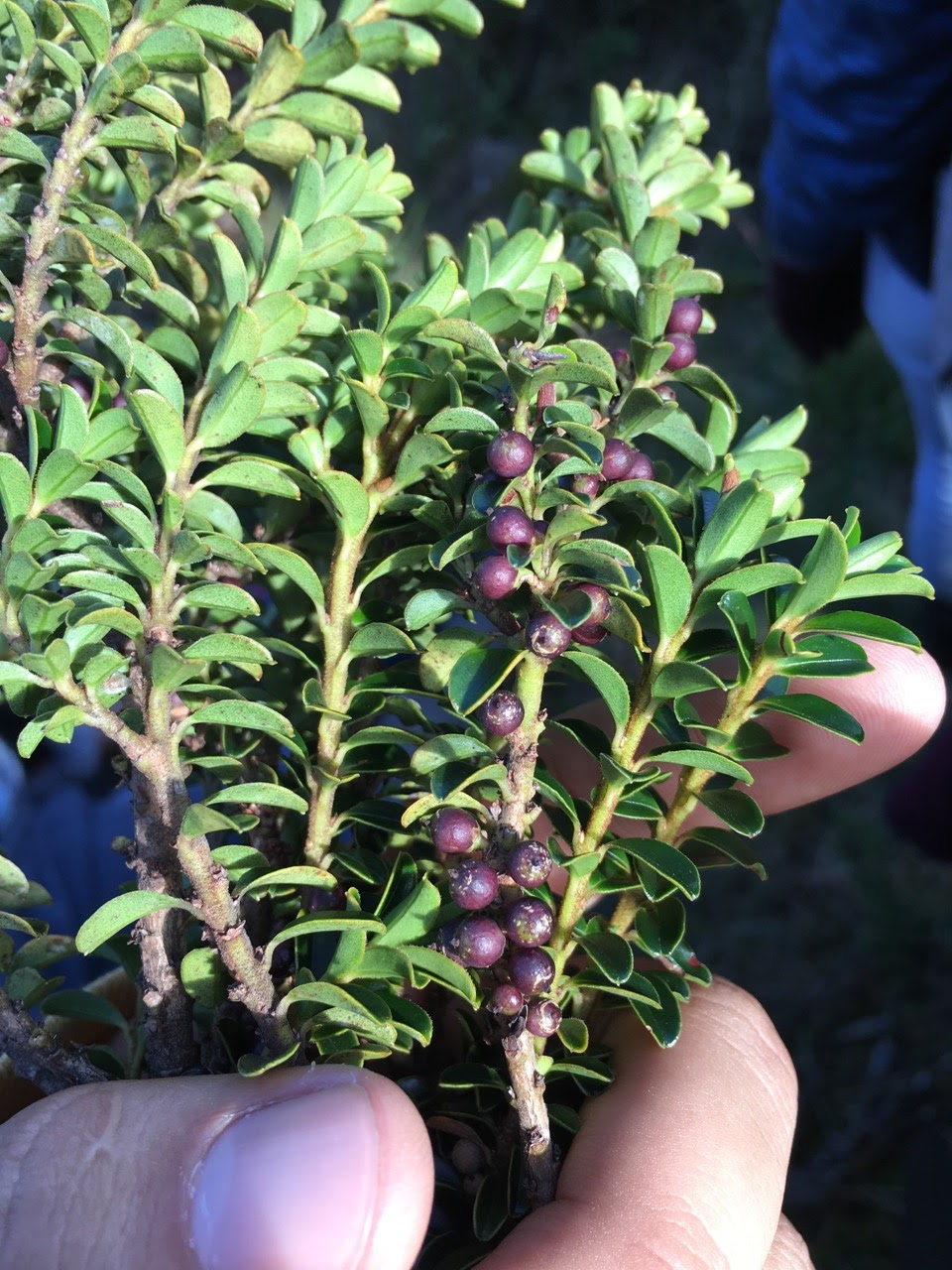

Scientific classification
- Kingdom: Plantae
- Clade: Tracheophytes
- Clade: Angiosperms
- Clade: Eudicots
- Clade: Asterids
- Order: Ericales
- Family: Primulaceae
- Subfamily: Myrsinoideae
- Genus: Parathesis (A.DC.) Hook.f.

= Parathesis =

Genus of flowering plants

Parathesis is a genus of flowering plants in the family Primulaceae. There are about 95 species distributed from Mexico to South America and the Caribbean. Plants of this genus can be distinguished by glandular papillae on the lobes of the flower corolla and bright yellow anthers.

== Species ==
The following species are recognised in the genus Parathesis:

- Parathesis acostensis J.F.Morales
- Parathesis acuminata Lundell
- Parathesis adenanthera (Miq.) Hook.f. ex B.D.Jacks.
- Parathesis aeruginosa Standl.
- Parathesis agostiniana Lundell
- Parathesis amazonica Mez
- Parathesis amplifolia Lundell
- Parathesis angustifolia Lundell
- Parathesis aurantiaca Lundell
- Parathesis belizensis Lundell
- Parathesis bicolor Lundell
- Parathesis bracteolata Lundell
- Parathesis breedlovei Lundell
- Parathesis calimensis Ricketson & Pipoly
- Parathesis calophylla Donn.Sm.
- Parathesis calzadae Lundell
- Parathesis candolleana Mez
- Parathesis cartagoana Lundell
- Parathesis chiapensis Fernald
- Parathesis cintalapana Lundell
- Parathesis columnaris Lundell
- Parathesis conzattii (S.F.Blake) Lundell
- Parathesis costata Lundell
- Parathesis crassiramea Lundell
- Parathesis crenulata (Vent.) Hook.f. ex Hemsl. – scratchthroat
- Parathesis croatii Lundell
- Parathesis cubana (A.DC.) Molinet & M.Gómez
- Parathesis cuspidata Lundell
- Parathesis donnell-smithii Mez
- Parathesis eggersiana Mez
- Parathesis emarginata Lundell
- Parathesis escuintlensis Lundell
- Parathesis ferruginea Lundell
- Parathesis fusca (Oerst.) Mez
- Parathesis glaberrima Lundell
- Parathesis glabra Donn.Sm.
- Parathesis glendae Ricketson
- Parathesis gracilis Lundell
- Parathesis hondurensis Standl.
- Parathesis kallunkiae Lundell
- Parathesis kochii Lundell
- Parathesis lanceolata Brandegee
- Parathesis latifolia Lundell
- Parathesis laxa Lundell
- Parathesis lenticellata Lundell
- Parathesis leptopa Lundell
- Parathesis longipedicellata Ricketson
- Parathesis macrantha Lundell
- Parathesis macronema Bullock
- Parathesis melanosticta (Schltdl.) Hemsl.
- Parathesis mexicana Lundell
- Parathesis microcalyx Donn.Sm.
- Parathesis minutiflora Lundell
- Parathesis montana Lundell
- Parathesis moritziana Mez
- Parathesis multiflora Lundell
- Parathesis navarretei Lundell
- Parathesis neei Lundell
- Parathesis oblanceolata Lundell
- Parathesis obtusa Lundell
- Parathesis oerstediana Mez
- Parathesis pajapanensis Lundell
- Parathesis palaciosii Pipoly
- Parathesis panamensis Lundell
- Parathesis papillosa Lundell
- Parathesis parvifolia Lundell
- Parathesis parvissima Lundell
- Parathesis perpunctata Lundell
- Parathesis pipolyana Ricketson
- Parathesis pleurobotryosa Donn.Sm.
- Parathesis prionophylla Standl.
- Parathesis pseudocalophylla Ricketson & Pipoly
- Parathesis pseudocrassiramea Ricketson & Pipoly
- Parathesis psychotrioides Lundell
- Parathesis pyramidalis Lundell
- Parathesis reflexa Brandegee
- Parathesis rekoi Standl.
- Parathesis reticulata Lundell
- Parathesis rosea Lundell
- Parathesis rothschuhiana Mez
- Parathesis rubriflora Lundell
- Parathesis rufa Lundell
- Parathesis schultesii Lundell
- Parathesis seibertii Lundell
- Parathesis serrulata (Sw.) Mez
- Parathesis sessilifolia Donn.Sm.
- Parathesis sinuata (Lundell) Ricketson & Pipoly
- Parathesis skutchii Lundell
- Parathesis stenophylla Lundell
- Parathesis subcoriacea Lundell
- Parathesis subulata Lundell
- Parathesis tartarea Lundell
- Parathesis tenorioi Lundell
- Parathesis tenuifolia Lundell
- Parathesis tenuis Standl.
- Parathesis tetramera Bullock
- Parathesis tomentosa Lundell
- Parathesis travisiae Lundell
- Parathesis trichogyne Hemsl.
- Parathesis tuxtlensis Lundell
- Parathesis venezuelana Mez
- Parathesis vestita Lundell
- Parathesis villalobosii Lundell
- Parathesis villosa Lundell
- Parathesis vulgata Lundell
- Parathesis wendtii Lundell
- Parathesis williamsii Lundell
- Parathesis zuliana Lundell
