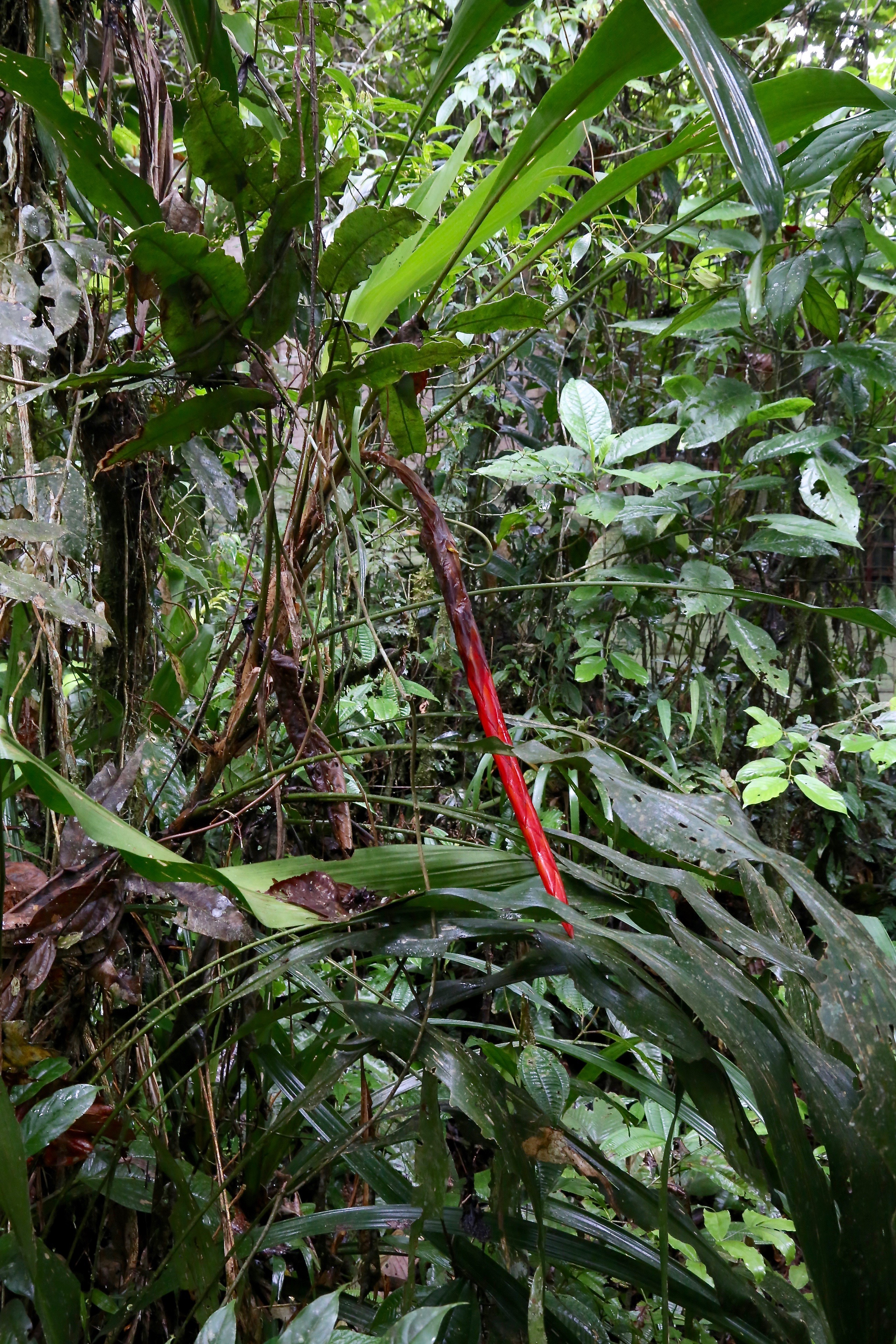

Conservation status
- Least Concern (IUCN 3.1)

Scientific classification
- Kingdom: Plantae
- Clade: Tracheophytes
- Clade: Angiosperms
- Clade: Monocots
- Clade: Commelinids
- Order: Poales
- Family: Bromeliaceae
- Genus: Pitcairnia
- Species: P. arcuata

Binomial name
- Pitcairnia arcuata (André) André

Synonyms
- Neumannia arcuata André; Hepetis arcuata (André) Mez; Pitcairnia oblanceolata L.B.Sm.; Pitcairnia brongniartiana var. latifolia L.B.Sm.

= Pitcairnia arcuata =

Species of plant

Pitcairnia arcuata is a flowering plant in the Bromeliaceae family. It is native to Costa Rica, Panama, Colombia, Peru, and Ecuador.
