= Carl Christian Mez =

German botanist

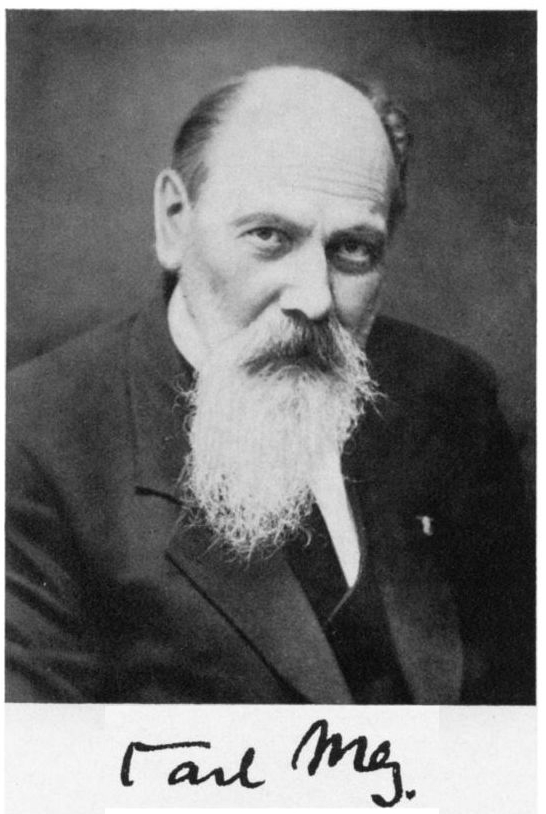
- Born: 26 March 1866; Freiburg im Breisgau, Grand Duchy of Baden
- Died: 8 January 1944 (aged 77); Freiburg im Breisgau, Germany
- Occupations: Botanist, Biologist
- Spouse: Thea Jensen (1890–1937, her death)
- Children: 5
- Scientific career
- Author abbrev. (botany): Mez

Carl Christian Mez (26 March 1866 – 8 January 1944) was a German botanist and university professor. He is denoted by the author abbreviation Mez when citing a botanical name.

Mez's grave in the Freiburg cemetery

== Life and work ==
Mez came from a family of industrialists in Freiburg im Breisgau, Baden. He was a grandchild of the entrepreneur and politician Karl Christian Mez (1808–1877). As a high-school student he was interested in botany, and wrote a technical paper regarding a hybrid Inula. In 1890, Mez married Therese (Thea) Jensen (1867–1937), the daughter of poet Wilhelm Jensen. They had 5 children together. Through their oldest daughter's marriage, they became parents-in-law to psychologist Narziß Ach.

He first studied at the university in his hometown from 1883 to 1884, and then moved to Berlin for one semester before returning in 1886 to Freiburg. He wrote his thesis at Berlin, on the Lauraceae (the Laurel family), and received his Ph.D. from there.

After completing his degree, Mez worked briefly at the Berlin Botanical Museum, then moved to Breslau where he worked as a private lecturer. In 1900, Mez became Professor of Systematic Botany and Pharmaceutical Studies in Halle, and in 1910 he became Professor of Plant-physiology and Director of the Botanical Gardens near Königsberg. He was made Professor Emeritus in 1935.

Mez was founder of the Botanical Archives, and, until 1938, publisher as well.

His main areas of research were systematics and physiology. He continued to study the taxonomy and morphology of the Lauraceae, and introduced the use of serology as a method of studying plant relationships. Also, he studied mycology, and wrote about dry rot.

The plant genera Mezia (Schwacke ex Nied.), Meziella (Schindl.) and Neomezia (family Primulaceae) were all named in his honor.

== Writings (selected) ==
- Lauraceae Americanae, monographice descripsit / - Berlin, 1889. Jahrbuch des königlichen botanischen Gartens und des botanischen Museums; Bd. 5
- Das Mikroskop und seine Anwendung : ein Leitfaden bei mikroskopischen Untersuchungen für Apotheker, Aerzte, Medicinalbeamte, Techniker, Gewerbtreibende etc.- 8., stark verm. Aufl. - Berlin : 1899
- Myrsinaceae. Leipzig [u.a.] 1902.
- Mikroskopische Untersuchungen, vorgeschrieben vom Deutschen Arzneibuch : Leitfaden für das mikroskopisch-pharmakognostische Praktikum an Hochschulen und für den Selbstunterricht - Berlin : 1902
- Theophrastaceae - Leipzig [u.a.] : 1903
- Der Hausschwamm und die übrigen holzzerstörenden Pilze der menschlichen Wohnungen : ihre Erkennung, Bedeutung und Bekämpfung. Dresden 1908.
- Die Haftung für Hausschwamm und Trockenfäule: eine Denkschrift für Baumeister, Hausbesitzer und Juristen .... Berlin 1910.
- Zur Theorie der Sero-Diagnostik - Berlin: Dt. Verl.-Ges. für Politik und Geschichte, 1925
- Drei Vorträge über die Stammesgeschichte der Pflanzenwelt mit 1 Stammbaum des Pflanzenreichs / 1925
- Theorien der Stammesgeschichte - Berlin : Deutsche Verl.-Ges für Politik und Geschichte, 1926
- Versuch einer Stammesgeschichte des Pilzreiches. Halle (Saale) 1928.
- Bromeliaceae. Leipzig 1935.
