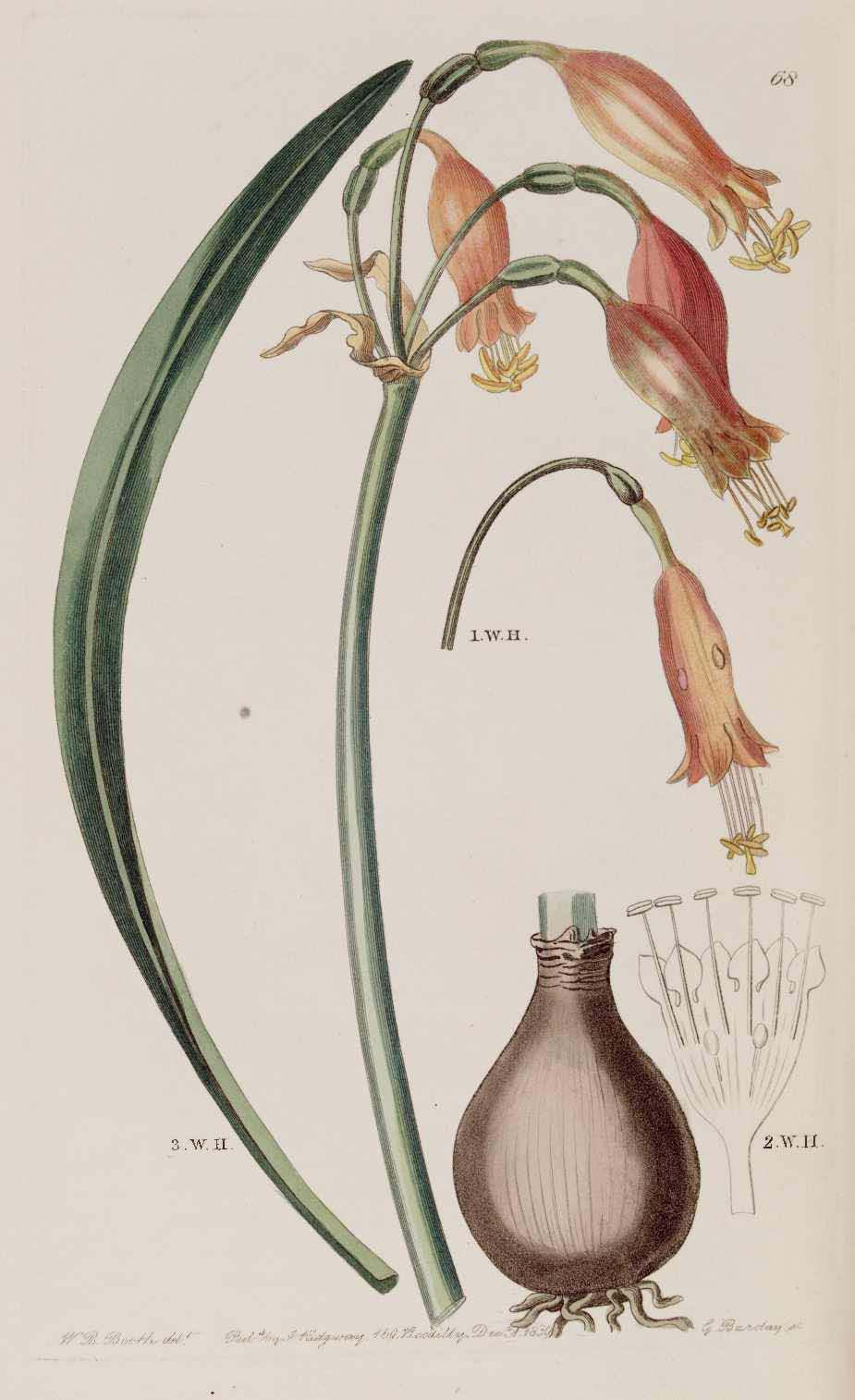
- Stenomesson miniatum

Scientific classification
- Kingdom: Plantae
- Clade: Tracheophytes
- Clade: Angiosperms
- Clade: Monocots
- Order: Asparagales
- Family: Amaryllidaceae
- Subfamily: Amaryllidoideae
- Tribe: Stenomesseae
- Genus: Stenomesson; Herb.

Type species
- Stenomesson flavum (Ruiz & Pav.) Herb.

Synonyms
- Chrysiphiala Ker Gawl.; Pentlandia Herb.; Pucara Ravenna; Sphaerotele C.Presl

= Stenomesson =

Genus of plants

Stenomesson is a genus of bulbous plants in the family Amaryllidaceae. All the species are native to western South America (Colombia, Ecuador, Peru and northern Chile).

== Taxonomy ==
It was published by William Herbert in 1821. The lectotype species Stenomesson flavum (Ruiz & Pav.) Herb. was designated by Hamilton Paul Traub in 1963.

=== Etymology ===
The generic name Stenomesson references the floral morphology. It is composed of the Greek words stenos, meaning narrow, and meso, meaning "in the middle".

=== Species ===
As of August 2023, Plants of the World Online accepted the following species:

- Stenomesson aurantiacum (Kunth) Herb. - Colombia, Ecuador, Peru
- Stenomesson breviflorum Herb. - Peru (Junín, Lima)
- Stenomesson campanulatum Alan Meerow - Peru (Cajamarca, La Libertad)
- Stenomesson chilense Ravenna - Chile (Tarapacá)
- Stenomesson chloranthum Meerow & van der Werff - Peru (Amazonas)
- Stenomesson ecuadorense Meerow, Oleas & L.Jost
- Stenomesson flavum (Ruiz & Pav.) Herb. - Peru (Cajamarca, Lima, La Libertad, Pasco)
- Stenomesson gasteroides Ravenna - Peru
- Stenomesson korsakoffii (Traub) Meerow – Peru
- Stenomesson leucanthum (Ravenna) Meerow & van der Werff - Peru (Cajamarca, La Libertad)
- Stenomesson miniatum (Herb.) Ravenna - Peru (Cajamarca, Apurimac, Cusco), Bolivia (La Paz)
- Stenomesson moldenkei Traub - Peru (Lima)
- Stenomesson parvulum Ravenna - Peru (Cajamarca])
- Stenomesson pauciflorum (Lindl. ex Hook.) Herb. - Peru (Lima)
- Stenomesson pearcei Baker - Peru (Junín, Puno, Cusco), Bolivia (La Paz)
- Stenomesson rupense Ravenna - Peru
- Stenomesson tubiflorum (Meerow) Meerow - Peru
- Stenomesson vitellinum Lindl. - Peru (Lima)
- Stenomesson weberbaueri (Vargas) Ravenna - Peru (Cajamarca])

Formerly included

Numerous names have been coined using the name Stenomesson referring to species now regarded as better suited to other genera (Clinanthus, Eucrosia, Ismene and Urceolina).

- Stenomesson acaule - Clinanthus humilis
- Stenomesson acutum - Clinanthus incarnatus
- Stenomesson callacallense - Clinanthus callacallensis
- Stenomesson campodense - Clinanthus campodensis
- Stenomesson caracense - Clinanthus caracensis
- Stenomesson chihuanhuayu - Clinanthus chihuanhuayu
- Stenomesson coccineum - Clinanthus coccineus
- Stenomesson croceum - Clinanthus croceus
- Stenomesson cuzcoense - Urceolina cuzcoensis
- Stenomesson discolor - Clinanthus recurvatus
- Stenomesson elwesii - Clinanthus elwesii
- Stenomesson ferreyrae - Clinanthus recurvatus
- Stenomesson flammidum - Clinanthus flammidus
- Stenomesson fulvum - Clinanthus fulvus
- Stenomesson glareosum - Clinanthus glareosus
- Stenomesson humile - Clinanthus humilis
- Stenomesson imasumacc - Clinanthus imasumacc
- Stenomesson incarnatum - Clinanthus incarnatus
- Stenomesson incarum - Clinanthus incarum
- Stenomesson longifolium - Clinanthus recurvatus
- Stenomesson luteum - Clinanthus luteus
- Stenomesson macleanicum - Clinanthus macleanicus
- Stenomesson microstephium - Clinanthus microstephium
- Stenomesson mirabile - Clinanthus mirabilis
- Stenomesson morrisonii - Ismene morrisonii
- Stenomesson obragillensis - Clinanthus recurvatus
- Stenomesson recurvatum - Clinanthus recurvatus
- Stenomesson rubrum - Clinanthus coccineus
- Stenomesson ruizianum - Clinanthus croceus
- Stenomesson splendens - Clinanthus incarnatus
- Stenomesson stricklandii - Eucrosia stricklandii
- Stenomesson sunchubambae - Clinanthus sunchubambae
- Stenomesson trichromum - Clinanthus incarnatus
- Stenomesson variegatum - Clinanthus variegatus
- Stenomesson viridiflorum - Clinanthus viridiflorus
