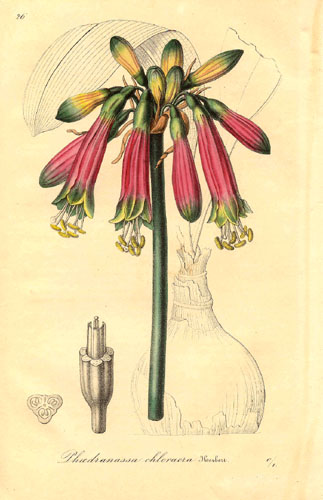
- Phaedranassa dubia

Scientific classification
- Kingdom: Plantae
- Clade: Tracheophytes
- Clade: Angiosperms
- Clade: Monocots
- Order: Asparagales
- Family: Amaryllidaceae
- Subfamily: Amaryllidoideae
- Tribe: Eucharideae
- Genus: Phaedranassa; Herb.

Type species
- Phaedranassa chloracra Herb.

= Phaedranassa =

Genus of flowering plants

Phaedranassa is a genus of South American and Central American plants in Amaryllis family, subfamily Amaryllidoideae.

== Description ==
=== Vegetative characteristics ===
Phaedranassa are bulbous, perennial herbs with ovate, long-necked bulbs and contractile roots. Mature non-contractile roots are 15–30 cm long. The leaves are petiolate.

=== Generative characteristics ===
The tall, umbellate inflorescence with a thick, round, hollow scape bears 5–15 tubular, inodorous, actinomorphic, pink, red, or yellow, green-banded flowers. The apex of the flowers is green. The stigma and stamens slightly extend beyond the floral tube. The flower has six tepals. The androecium consists of 6 stamens. The gynoecium consists of 3 carpels. The stigma is clavate. The many-seeded capsule fruit bears papery seeds.

=== Cytology ===
The chromosome count is 2n = 46.

== Taxonomy ==
=== Publication ===
The genus Phaedranassa Herb. was published by William Herbert in 1845. The type species is Phaedranassa chloracra Herb. (a synonym of Phaedranassa dubia (Kunth) J.F.Macbr.)

=== Species ===
As of June 2023, Plants of the World Online accepted the following species:

- Phaedranassa brevifolia Meerow - Ecuador
- Phaedranassa carmiolii Baker - Costa Rica
- Phaedranassa cinerea Ravenna - Ecuador
- Phaedranassa cuencana Minga, C.Ulloa & Oleas - Ecuador
- Phaedranassa dubia (Kunth) J.F.Macbr. - Colombia, Ecuador
- Phaedranassa glauciflora Meerow - Ecuador
- Phaedranassa lehmannii Regel - Colombia
- Phaedranassa schizantha Baker - Ecuador
- Phaedranassa tunguraguae Ravenna - Ecuador
- Phaedranassa viridiflora Baker - Ecuador

=== Formerly included ===
Several names have been coined using the name Phaedranassa but referring to species now regarded as better suited in other genera (Eucrosia, Rauhia and Stenomesson).

- Phaedranassa eucrosioides - Eucrosia stricklandii var. stricklandii
- Phaedranassa loxana - Eucrosia stricklandii var. montana
- Phaedranassa megistophylla - Rauhia multiflora
- Phaedranassa multiflora - Rauhia multiflora
- Phaedranassa rubroviridis - Eustephia coccinea
- Phaedranassa vitellina - Stenomesson aurantiacum

== Ecology ==
The flowers are bird-pollinated.

== Cultivation ==
Phaedranassa are easily cultivated.
