= Pitcairnia caduciflora =

Conservation status
- Endangered (IUCN 3.1)

Scientific classification
- Kingdom: Plantae
- Clade: Tracheophytes
- Clade: Angiosperms
- Clade: Monocots
- Clade: Commelinids
- Order: Poales
- Family: Bromeliaceae
- Genus: Pitcairnia
- Species: P. caduciflora

Binomial name
- Pitcairnia caduciflora Rauh & E.Gross

Species of flowering plant

Pitcairnia caduciflora is a species of plant in the family Bromeliaceae. It is endemic to Ecuador, where it is known from only one site in Pastaza Province. It is an epiphyte that grows in the forests of the lower Andes, and it is threatened by habitat destruction.
