= Peperomia wernerrauhii =

Scientific classification
- Kingdom: Plantae
- Clade: Embryophytes
- Clade: Tracheophytes
- Clade: Spermatophytes
- Clade: Angiosperms
- Clade: Magnoliids
- Order: Piperales
- Family: Piperaceae
- Genus: Peperomia
- Species: P. wernerrauhii

Binomial name
- Peperomia wernerrauhii Pino & Samain

Species of plant

Peperomia wernerrauhii is a species of tuberous geophyte in the genus Peperomia. It is endemic to the country of Peru and was discovered in Peru by Guillermo Pino and Marie-Stéphanie Samain. It primarily grows in dry tropical biome.

== Etymology ==
Peperomia wernerrauhii is named for renowned German botanist and biologist Werner Rauh.
