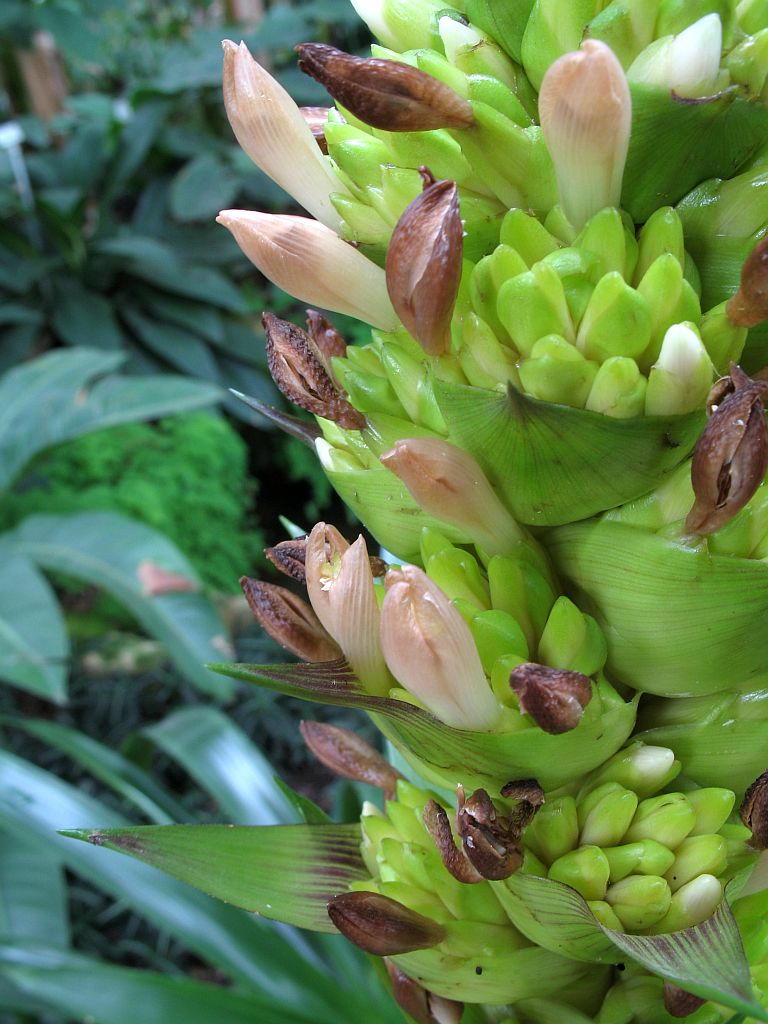
- Guzmania roseiflora in cultivation at the Botanical Garden of Heidelberg, Germany

Conservation status
- Endangered (IUCN 3.1)

Scientific classification
- Kingdom: Plantae
- Clade: Tracheophytes
- Clade: Angiosperms
- Clade: Monocots
- Clade: Commelinids
- Order: Poales
- Family: Bromeliaceae
- Genus: Guzmania
- Species: G. roseiflora

Binomial name
- Guzmania roseiflora Rauh

= Guzmania roseiflora =

Species of flowering plant

Guzmania roseiflora is a species of flowering plant in the family Bromeliaceae. It is an epiphyte endemic to northern Ecuador. Its natural habitat is subtropical or tropical moist montane forests. It is threatened by habitat loss.
