= Leonard La Cour =

British cytologist

La Cour in 1972

Leonard Francis La Cour OBE FRS (28 July 1907 – 3 November 1984) was a British cytologist particularly known for his work on plant chromosomes. He spent nearly all of his career at the John Innes Horticultural Institution (1922–72), where, despite a lack of any formal scientific training – he left school at fourteen and never attended university – he rose to senior principal scientific officer. After retiring from the John Innes institute, he held an honorary chair at the University of East Anglia (1973–78). His research encompassed studies of the cell nucleus and chromosome structure and function, using light and electron microscopy. He developed novel cytological methods and published a generally well-received laboratory manual, The Handling of Chromosomes (1942), with his frequent collaborator, C. D. Darlington.

== Biography ==
He was born on 28 July 1907 in the Borough of Lambeth, south London, to Maude (née Coomber) and Francis Lacour, both of whom worked at Buckingham Palace. His father, a chef, died when he was an infant, and his mother remarried and moved to the Isle of Bute; he was brought up by his grandmother at Merton Park in Surrey. She ran a tobacconist's, and they lived above the shop. He attended the local school in Merton until he was fourteen.

In 1922, despite lacking scientific training, he secured a position as a laboratory assistant at the nearby John Innes Horticultural Institution, after an interview with William Bateson, the institute's director. La Cour later recalled that his early duties had included cleaning the windows. He remained at the institute for much of his career, rising to technical assistant (1926), senior experimental officer (1948), acting head of the cytology department (1953), chief experimental officer (1956) and senior principal scientific officer (1970), and moving with the institute when it relocated to Bayfordbury in Hertfordshire in 1949 and then to Norwich in 1967. He retired from the John Innes in 1972, and took up an honorary chair at the University of East Anglia, which he held from 1973 until 1978.

He changed his surname to La-Cour for his earliest publications, and then to La Cour from 1931. In 1935 or 1936 he married Anne Wilkes; the couple did not have children. Portrait photography and gardening were among his interests. In retirement he moved to Eastbourne, where he died after a stroke on 3 November 1984.

== Research and publications ==
By 1928–32 La Cour had become skilled at making chromosomal preparations for light microscopy of both plants and insects. His skill in microscopic preparation techniques quickly became an asset to the John Innes laboratory. His first paper, on fixatives for use in plant cytology, was published in Nature in 1929. He improved on the formulation of existing fixatives, developing three new ones that were widely used until the embedding and sectioning method of preparing samples was abandoned in favour of the squash technique. In 1941 he improved the latter by using orcein with acetic acid as a stain fixative, and subsequent work with A. C. Fabergé extended this technique to some other carboxylic acids, to produce a widely used staining method.

Early in his career, La Cour assisted various researchers including Brenhilda Schafer, Margaret Upcott, C. L. Huskins and F. W. Sansome. A survey of Aconitum species chromosomes, co-authored with Schafer, employed a side-by-side presentation of the chromosome pairs, which later became the standard way of presenting this information. In the late 1930s La Cour started to research whether different treatments of the growing plant before taking samples affected the appearance of the chromosomal preparations. He found that cold treatment of Paris polyphylla resulted in differentially stained chromosomes, with parts of the chromosome only appearing lightly stained, and with C. D. Darlington, went on to show that this differential staining correlated with highly condensed heterochromatin, recently identified by Emil Heitz. These results were published in 1938, the first of ten research papers La Cour co-authored with Darlington during a long association. Their attempts at hypothesising a basis for the difference in staining density were hampered by the lack of knowledge about chromosomal structure at that date. La Cour continued to research cold-induced light staining in chromosomes in Trillium and other species in work published in 1951, showing that these regions were usually found near the centromere, in plants and animals including Amblystoma mexicanum. He returned to this topic in the 1970s at the University of East Anglia, studying heterochromatin in Fritillaria species by light microscopy.

In the 1940s and 1950s, he studied chromosomal abnormalities induced by X-rays, with Darlington, and later alone and with A. Rutishauser. Working alone, La Cour found that Hyacinthus cells with an additional nucleolus were more resistant to X-ray damage, and demonstrated that Luzula chromosomes were unusual in having multiple separate centromeres, termed "polycentric". With Rutishauser, he also studied the spontaneous occurrence of chromosomal abnormalities in plant endosperm, showing that this was generally very unusual, but in hybrids between two genera, Paris and Trillium, chromosome breaks were common but restricted to the Trillium chromosomes. During the 1940s, he also conducted studies on human chromosomes from bone marrow. In the 1960s, in collaboration with Henry Harris, he used radiolabelling to show that some RNA was synthesised in the cytoplasm, rather than the nucleus, now interpreted as resulting from mitochondrial DNA; they also pinpointed RNA synthesis within the nucleolus.

After the institute relocated to Norwich in 1967, La Cour started transmission electron microscopy studies of nuclear structure in collaboration with B. Wells, focusing on the nucleolus, nuclear pores, and the synaptonemal complex, the structures involved in pairing homologous chromosomes during meiosis. They demonstrated that fibrils previously identified in the nucleolus were loops and hypothesised that these represented DNA. They used a durum wheat strain unable to pair its chromosomes to dissect the role of different parts of the synaptonemal complex, revealing that the mutant did not form cross fibrils. Later, in Phaedranassa viridiflora pollen mother cells, they observed two strands of 3.0–3.5 nm after disrupting the central core of the synaptonemal complex, hypothesising that these represented the "chromosome axes".

La Cour co-authored a textbook with Darlington, The Handling of Chromosomes (1942), which ran to six editions and was translated into Russian. It was generally well received; for example, a reviewer for the British Medical Journal describes the first edition as a "perfect specimen of what a laboratory manual can be at its best." Irene Manton, however, in a more-balanced review for Nature, considered that it was positioned between the needs of inexperienced and expert researchers, but that there was a "solid core of real value" as an "introductory reference to some interesting, new and useful laboratory methods."

== Awards and honours ==
La Cour was awarded the MBE (1952) and OBE (1973). He was elected a Fellow of the Royal Society in 1970, "for his researches on chromosome structure and behaviour and for his development of new cytological techniques." The University of East Anglia awarded him an honorary MSc (1969) and a DSc (1977).

== Key publications ==
Books

- C. D. Darlington, L. F. La Cour. The Handling of Chromosomes (George Allen & Unwin; 1942)

Research papers

- C. D. Darlington, L. F. La Cour (1945). Chromosome breakage and the nucleic acid cycle. Journal of Genetics 46: 180–267 doi:10.1007/BF02989269
