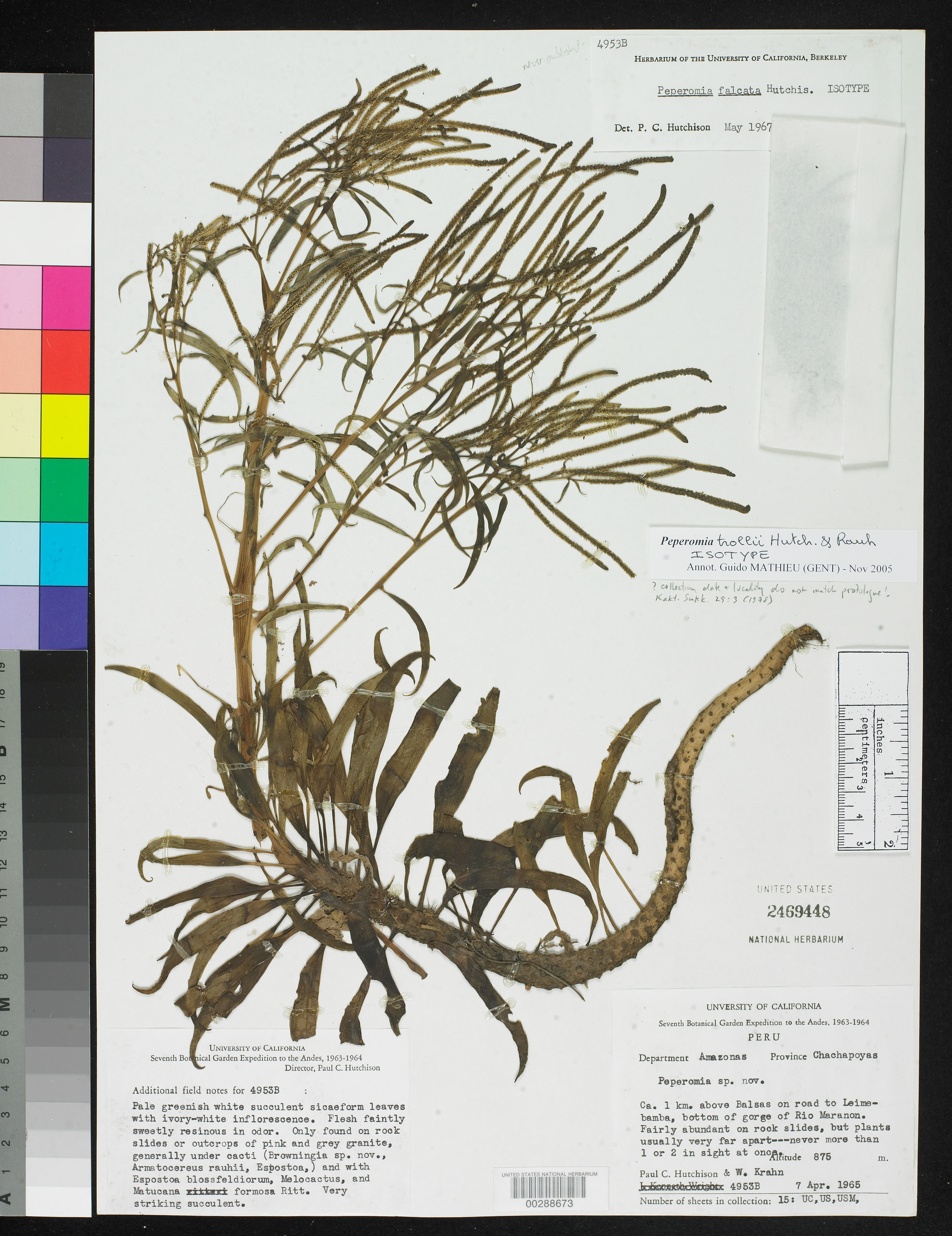

Scientific classification
- Kingdom: Plantae
- Clade: Tracheophytes
- Clade: Angiosperms
- Clade: Magnoliids
- Order: Piperales
- Family: Piperaceae
- Genus: Peperomia
- Species: P. trollii

Binomial name
- Peperomia trollii Hutchison & Rauh

= Peperomia trollii =

Species of flowering plant

Peperomia trollii is a species of flowering plant in the genus Peperomia endemic in Peru. Its conservation status is Threatened.

== Description ==
The first specimens where collected in Peru.

Peperomia trollii has is a stem-bearing, flowering plant up to 60 cm tall. It has a succulent stem up to 10–30 cm long and 2 cm thick at the base. It is covered by the bases of the succulent petioles arranged in a spiral manner, numerous leaves forming a dense rosette of petioles 1–2 cm long. The lamina is curved downwards into a hooked apex, flattened vertically twisted that 1-1.5 cm wide in the middle and 4–6 cm long. The surface is reduced into a narrow window, pale green, inflorescence axes up to 20 cm long much thinner than the vegetative axes. Those leaves are loosely arranged, passing into a terminal white spike up to 10 cm long, 5 mm in diameter. Below the terminal spike are the 5-7 first-order paracladia emanating from the leaf axils, which again generate paracladia of the second order. The inflorescences are very ramified. The Inflorescence have a characteristic of axes that white or pale reddish, moderately angled, 3–5 mm diameter, with spirally arranged ivory bracts with short petiolate peltate ovate acuminate blades 3–4 mm long. The ovary small, measuring up to 1.5 mm long, sessile, whitish, style and stigma inserted on the side of the ovary, slightly impressed. There are two anthers with a very short filament and two large spherical locules.

== Taxonomy and Naming ==
It was described in 1978 by Hutchison & Rauh in Kakteen und andere Sukkulenten, from specimens collected by Paul Clifford Hutchison. It got its name from the description of the leaves, which means 3-nerved.

== Distribution and Habitat ==
It is endemic in Peru. It grows on a succulent environment.

== Conservation ==
This species is assessed as Threatened, in a preliminary report.
