= Vriesea wuelfinghoffii =

Conservation status
- Vulnerable (IUCN 3.1)

Scientific classification
- Kingdom: Plantae
- Clade: Tracheophytes
- Clade: Angiosperms
- Clade: Monocots
- Clade: Commelinids
- Order: Poales
- Family: Bromeliaceae
- Genus: Vriesea
- Species: V. wuelfinghoffii

Binomial name
- Vriesea wuelfinghoffii Rauh & E.Gross

Species of flowering plant

Vriesea wuelfinghoffii is a species of plant in the family Bromeliaceae. It is endemic to Ecuador. Its natural habitat is subtropical or tropical dry forests.
