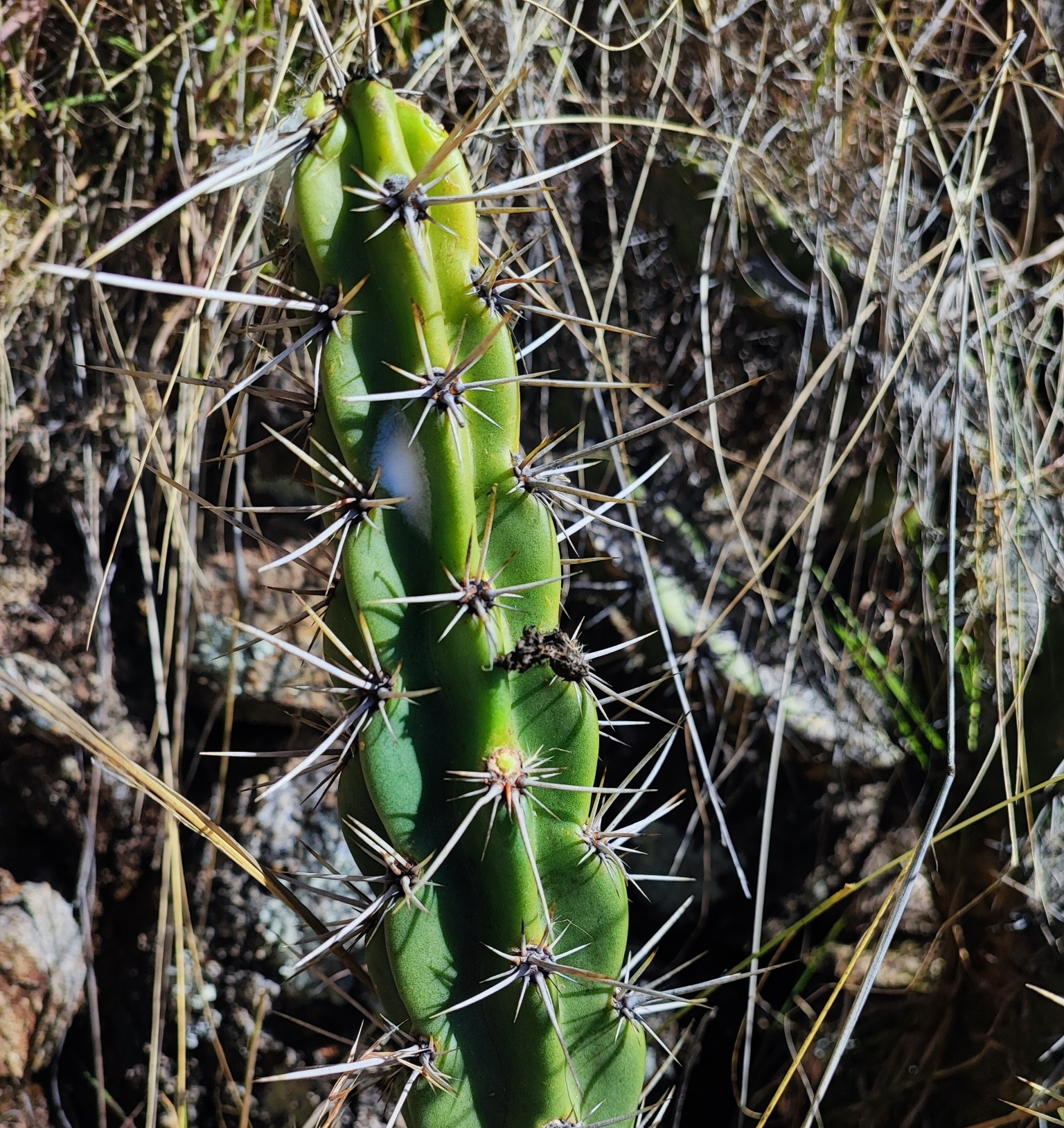

Scientific classification
- Kingdom: Plantae
- Clade: Tracheophytes
- Clade: Angiosperms
- Clade: Eudicots
- Order: Caryophyllales
- Family: Cactaceae
- Subfamily: Cactoideae
- Genus: Corryocactus
- Species: C. quadrangularis

Binomial name
- Corryocactus quadrangularis (Rauh & Backeb.) F.Ritter ex D.R.Hunt, N.P.Taylor & G.J.Charles, 2006

Synonyms
- Erdisia quadrangularis Rauh & Backeb. 1956 publ. 1957; Corryocactus prostratus F.Ritter 1981

= Corryocactus quadrangularis =

Species of cactus

Corryocactus quadrangularis is a species of Corryocactus found in Peru.

== Description ==
This species typically grows to a height of 1 to 1.5 meters and branches from its base. Its upright stems, which can sometimes become pendulous, are quadrangular in shape, measuring 4 to 5 cm in diameter. These stems feature 4 to 5 (occasionally up to 6) deep, wavy, wing-shaped ribs. Black, felted areoles on these ribs bear whitish-yellow spines: 1 to 2 strong central spines that are 4 to 6 cm long and 4 to 8 radial spines that are 1 to 2 cm long. The flowers of Corryocactus quadrangularis are golden yellow to carmine red and measure 4 to 5 cm in length. Its fruits are reddish-green.

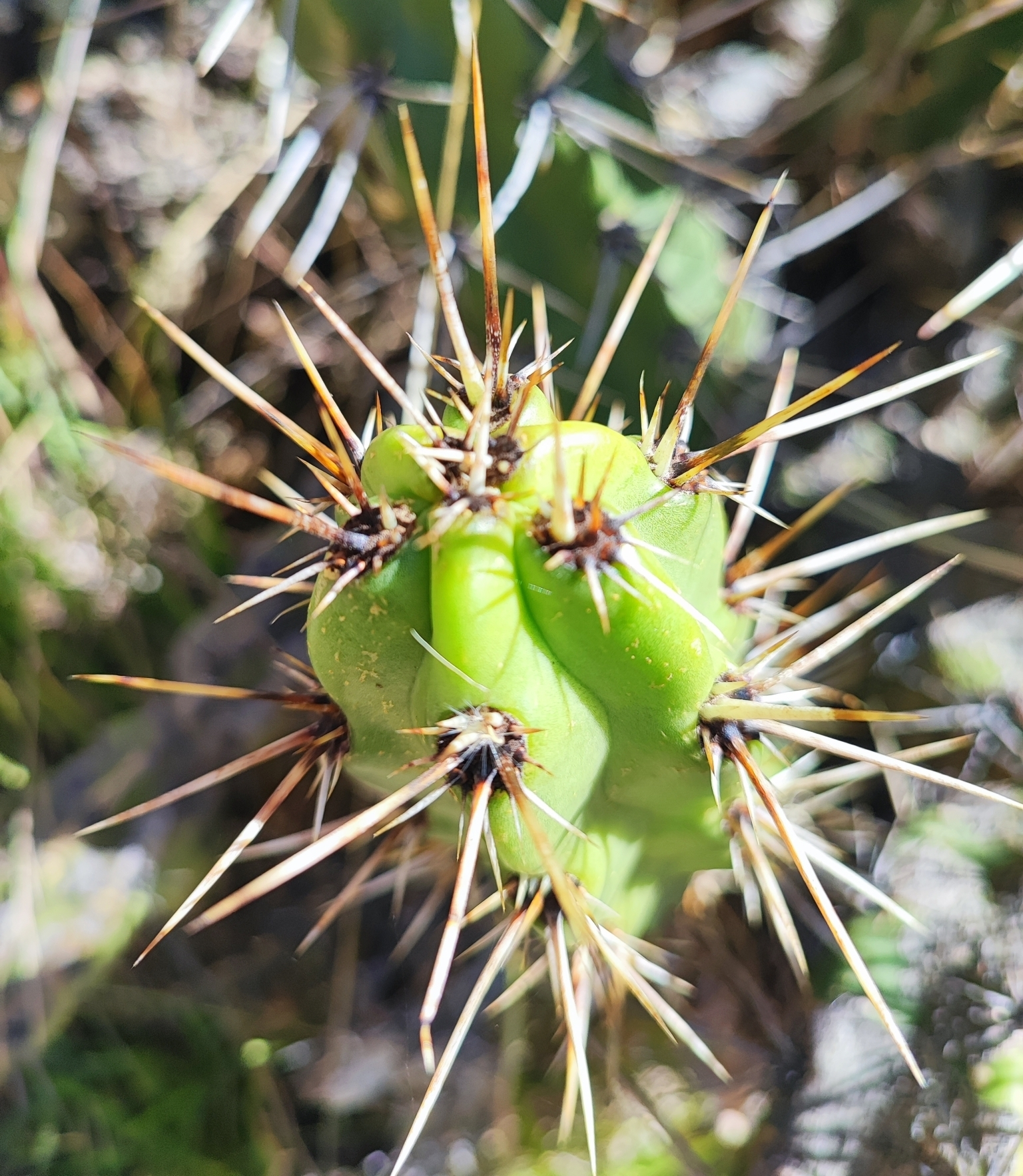
Closeup of spines

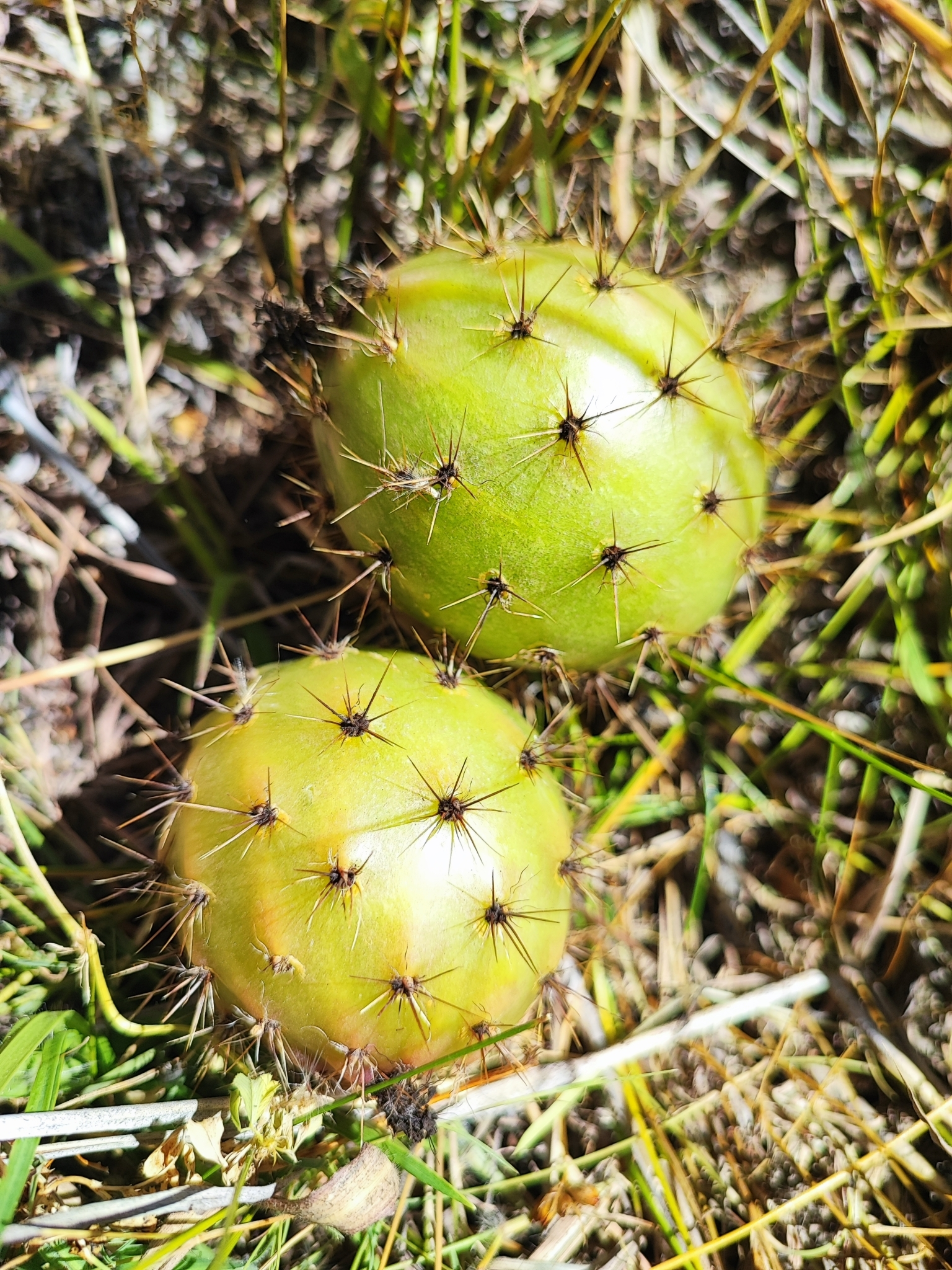
Fruit

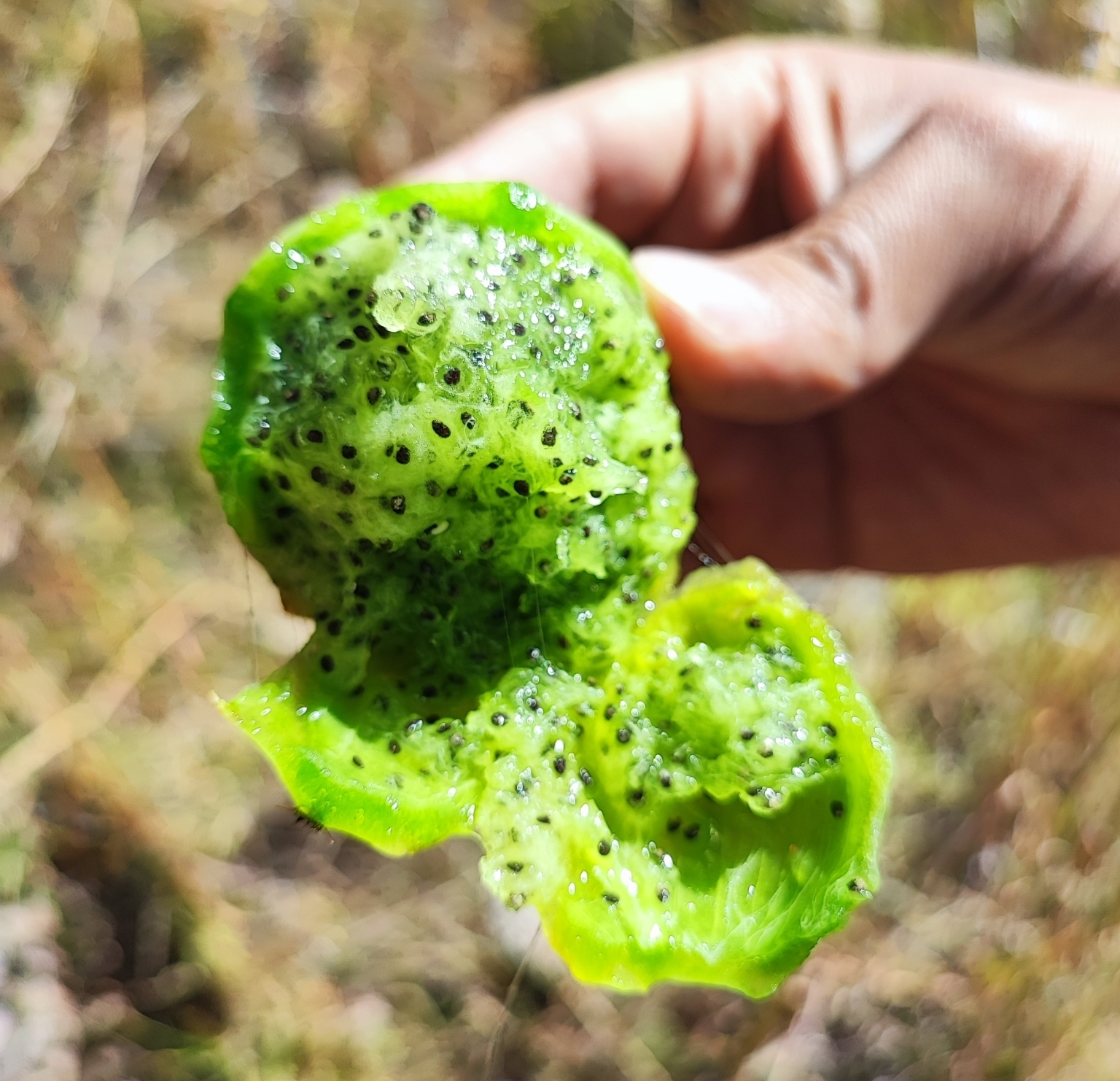
Half of fruit

== Distribution ==
Corryocactus quadrangularis is a shrubby cactus native to Peru, commonly found in desert or dry scrub biomes within inter-Andean valleys near Puquio, Ayacucho, at elevations around 3300 meters.

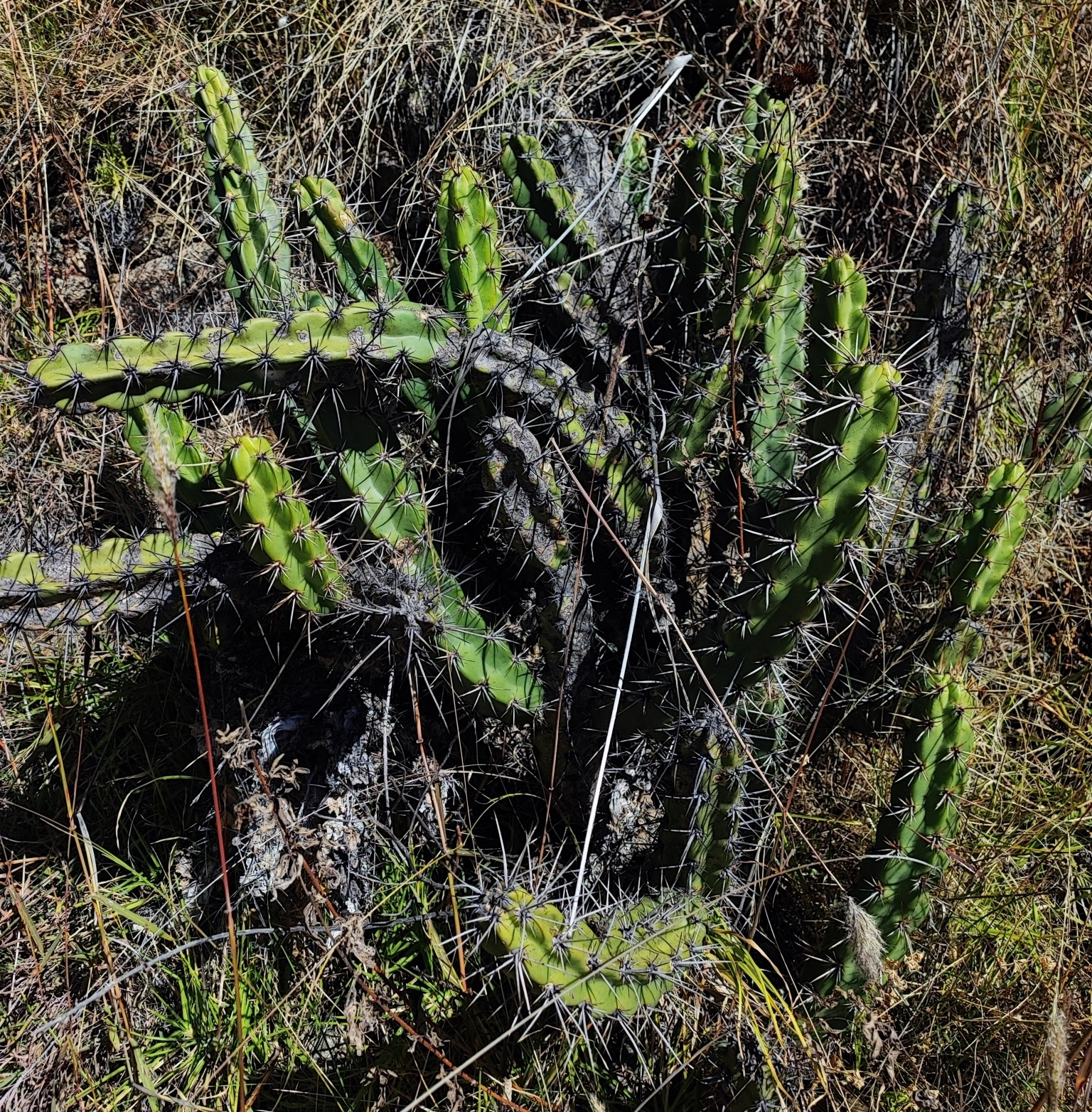
Plant growing in Mayobamba, Peru

== Taxonomy ==
Originally described as Erdisia quadrangularis in 1957 by Werner Rauh and Curt Backeberg, the species was later transferred to the genus Corryocactus by Ritter, Hunt, Taylor, and Charles in 2006. The specific epithet "quadrangularis" refers to the plant's four-angled stems.
