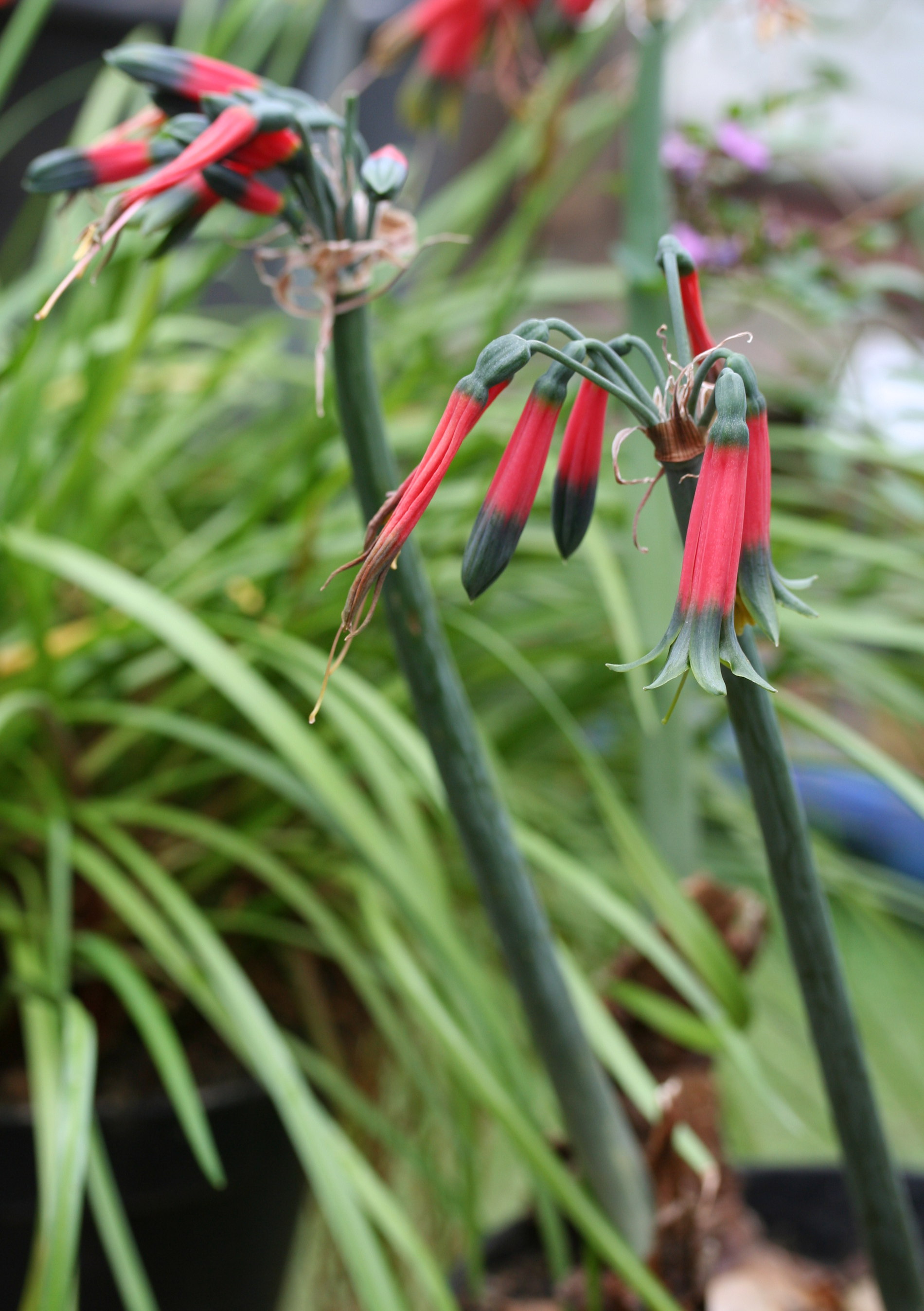

Conservation status
- Endangered (IUCN 3.1)

Scientific classification
- Kingdom: Plantae
- Clade: Tracheophytes
- Clade: Angiosperms
- Clade: Monocots
- Order: Asparagales
- Family: Amaryllidaceae
- Subfamily: Amaryllidoideae
- Genus: Phaedranassa
- Species: P. tunguraguae

Binomial name
- Phaedranassa tunguraguae Ravenna
- Phaedranassa tunguraguae is endemic to Ecuador

= Phaedranassa tunguraguae =

Species of flowering plant

Phaedranassa tunguraguae is a species of plant that is endemic to Ecuador. Its natural habitats are subtropical or tropical moist montane forests and subtropical or tropical dry shrubland. It is threatened by habitat loss.

== Reproduction ==
=== Generative reproduction ===
This species is self-compatible.

== Taxonomy ==
=== Publication ===
It was first published by Pierfelice Ravenna in 1969.

== Ecology ==
=== Pollination ===
It may be pollinated by hummingbirds.

== Conservation ==
The IUCN conservation status is endangered (EN).
