= Eucrosia mirabilis =

Scientific classification
- Kingdom: Plantae
- Clade: Tracheophytes
- Clade: Angiosperms
- Clade: Monocots
- Order: Asparagales
- Family: Amaryllidaceae
- Subfamily: Amaryllidoideae
- Genus: Eucrosia
- Species: E. mirabilis

Binomial name
- Eucrosia mirabilis (Baker) Pax

Synonyms
- Callipsyche mirabilis Baker

Species of plant

Eucrosia mirabilis is a species of plant from Ecuador. In the original scientific description in 1869, it was believed to be from Peru, but there is little evidence it ever grew there. The plant disappeared from cultivation until it was found in Ecuador in 1997. Its natural habitats are seasonally dry lowland areas to elevations of 1500 m.

It grows from bulbs around 7 cm in diameter. One to three blue-green stalked (petiolate) leaves appear after flowering, with blades (laminae) 40 cm long by 20 cm wide. About 30 zygomorphic flowers, which are yellow-green, are produced in an umbel on a 60–90 cm tall stem (scape); the stamens have prominent long white filaments. In its natural habitat, flowering is August to December. The flowers are thought to be adapted for butterfly pollination, but a single report of hummingbird visitation is recorded for this species.

In cultivation, plants should be kept warm and dry when the leaves wither, and watered only when the flowers or leaves begin to grow again, when a sunny position is required.
