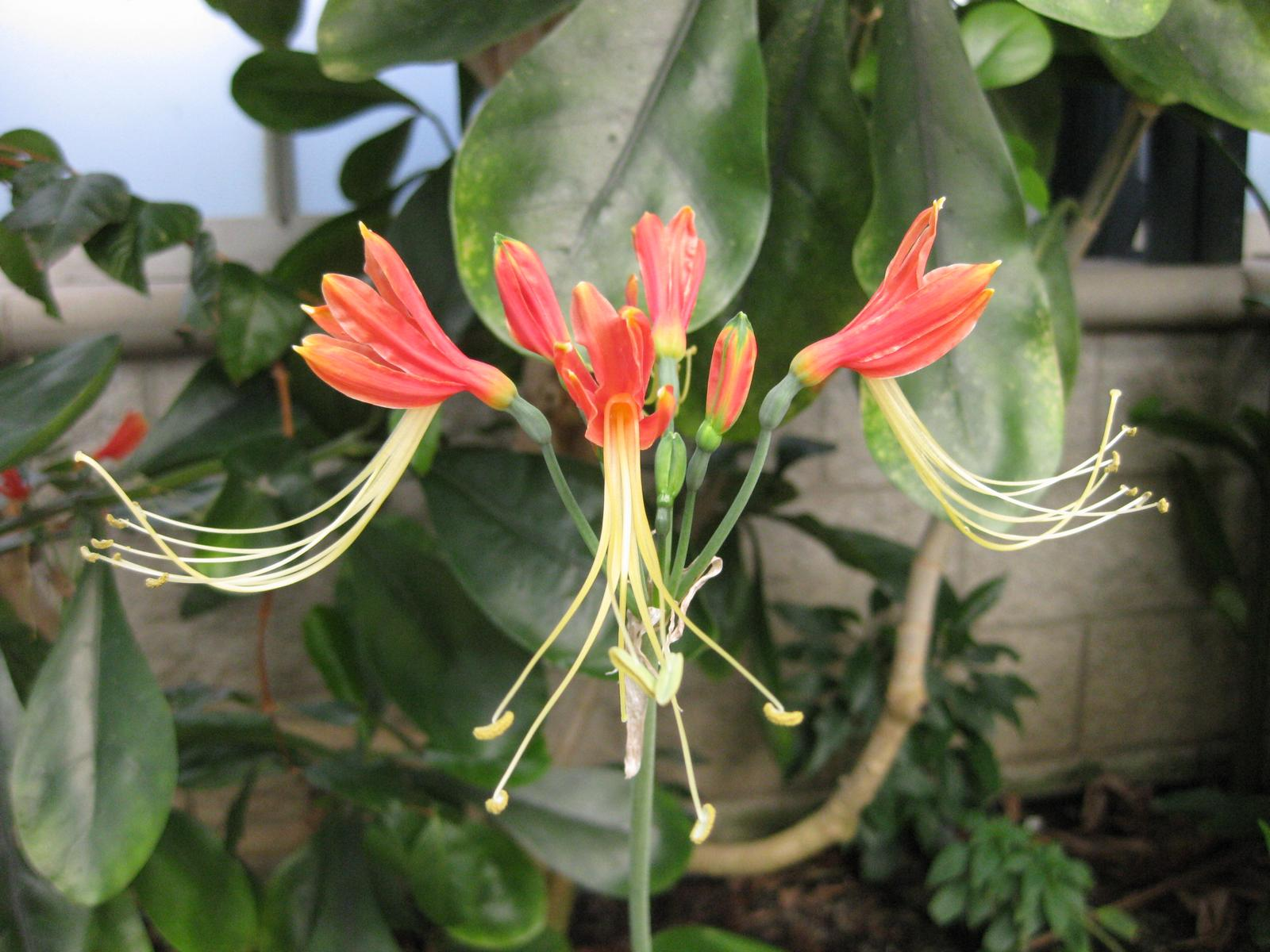
- Flowers of Eucrosia bicolor

Scientific classification
- Kingdom: Plantae
- Clade: Tracheophytes
- Clade: Angiosperms
- Clade: Monocots
- Order: Asparagales
- Family: Amaryllidaceae
- Subfamily: Amaryllidoideae
- Tribe: Eucharideae
- Genus: Eucrosia; Ker Gawl.

Type species
- Eucrosia bicolor Ker Gawl.

Species
- See text

Synonyms
- Callipsyche Herb.; Neostricklandia Rauschert; Stricklandia Baker

= Eucrosia =

Genus of flowering plants

Eucrosia is a genus of herbaceous, perennial and bulbous plants in the Amaryllis family (Amaryllidaceae, subfamily Amaryllidoideae) distributed from Ecuador to Peru. The name is derived from the Greek eu, beautiful, and krossos, a fringe, referring to the long stamens. As circumscribed in 2020, the genus contains six species. Phaedranassa and Rauhia are the genera most closely related to Eucrosia.

== Description ==
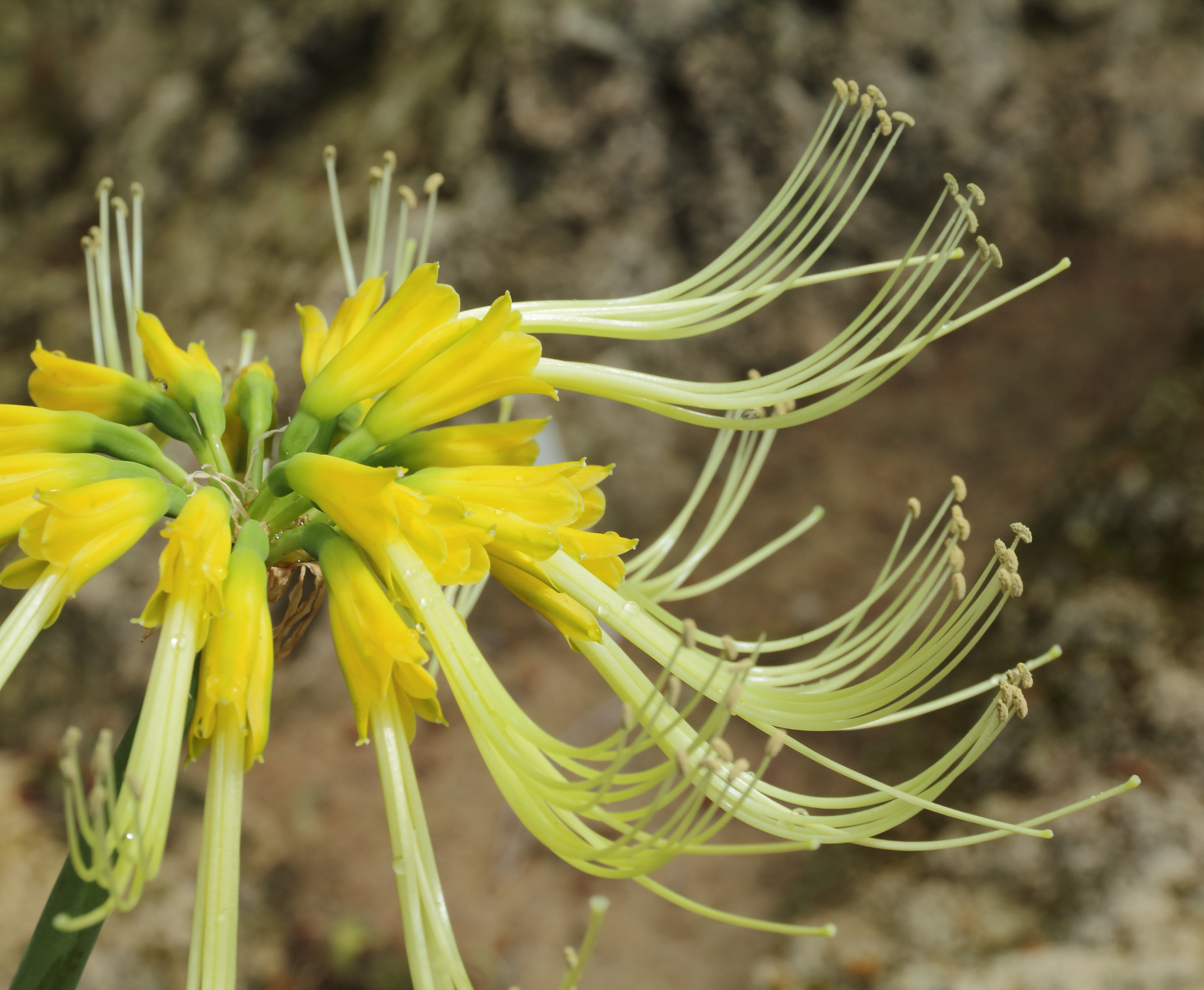
Eucrosia aurantiaca

All the members of the genus are bulbous. The leaves are deciduous, with characteristic long petioles and elliptical or ovate blades (laminae), up to 25 cm wide; they may or may not be present when the flowers are produced. The inflorescence is an umbel of 6–30 weakly to strongly zygomorphic flowers, tubular at the base, green, yellow or red in colour. The stamens hang downwards (i.e. are declinate) and have long filaments which in most species form a cup containing nectaries at the base. The flowers are assumed to be adapted for butterfly pollination, although there is one report of a hummingbird visiting E. eucrosioides. The fruit is a capsule with three locules; the seeds are flattened and winged. The diploid chromosome number is most commonly 2n=46.

== Taxonomy ==
The genus name Eucrosia was published by John Bellenden Ker Gawler in 1817 with Eucrosia bicolor Ker Gawl. as the type species.

=== Species ===
As of August 2025, Plants of the World Online accepted six species:

- Eucrosia aurantiaca (Baker) Pax – southern central Ecuador
- Eucrosia bicolor Ker Gawl. – Ecuador to Peru
- Eucrosia calendulina Meerow & Sagást. – Peru
- Eucrosia eucrosioides (Herb.) Pax – southwestern Ecuador to northern Peru
- Eucrosia mirabilis (Baker) Pax – Peru, Ecuador
- Eucrosia stricklandii (Baker) Meerow – Ecuador

Two formerly accepted species have been moved to other genera:

- Eucrosia dodsonii Meerow & Dehgan = Urceolina dodsonii (Meerow & Dehgan) Meerow
- Eucrosia tubiflora Meerow = Stenomesson tubiflorum (Meerow) Meerow

== Distribution and habitat ==
Eucrosia is restricted to the central Andes of Ecuador and Peru. All of the species are found only in small areas or as small numbers of individuals. Two species are endemic to Ecuador, one to Peru. Three further species are only occasionally found in Peru, being primarily distributed in Ecuador. All species of Eucrosia are adapted to seasonally dry habitats, found on the lower, Pacific-facing slopes of the Andes and the adjacent lowlands.

== Cultivation ==
In cultivation, all species can be grown in pots in gritty soil in good light, being kept warm and dry when the leaves wither, and watered when the flowers or leaves begin to grow again. Only E. bicolor is widely grown. Eucrosia has been successfully used in intergeneric hybridisation with Rauhia.

== Bibliography ==
- Grossi, Alberto (2010), "Eucrosia in cultivation", The Plantsman, New Series, 9 (4): 239–244
- Meerow, Alan W. (1987), "A Monograph of Eucrosia (Amaryllidaceae)", Systematic Botany, 12 (4): 460–492, doi:10.2307/2418883, JSTOR 2418883
- Meerow, Alan W.; Gardner, Elliot M.; Nakamura, Kyoko (2020). "Phylogenomics of the Andean Tetraploid Clade of the American Amaryllidaceae (Subfamily Amaryllidoideae): Unlocking a Polyploid Generic Radiation Abetted by Continental Geodynamics". Frontiers in Plant Science. 11 582422. doi:10.3389/fpls.2020.582422. ISSN 1664-462X. PMC 7674842. PMID 33250911.
