= Eucrosia calendulina =

Scientific classification
- Kingdom: Plantae
- Clade: Tracheophytes
- Clade: Angiosperms
- Clade: Monocots
- Order: Asparagales
- Family: Amaryllidaceae
- Subfamily: Amaryllidoideae
- Genus: Eucrosia
- Species: E. calendulina

Binomial name
- Eucrosia calendulina Meerow & Sagást.

Species of plant

Eucrosia calendulina is a species of flowering plant in the family Amaryllidaceae. It is endemic to Peru.

All members of the genus Eucrosia grow from bulbs and have stalked (petiolate) leaves with wide blades (laminae). The zygomorphic flowers are produced in an umbel. The stamens have prominent long filaments.

E. calendulina is known only from the lower limits of the Cachil Forest of Peru. The species is threatened by habitat destruction.
