= Niemegk, Saxony-Anhalt =

Coordinates: 51.6120°N 12.3660°E

Niemegk
- Abandoned village
- Location in Saxony-Anhalt, Germany
- Country: Germany
- State: Saxony-Anhalt
- Former district: Bitterfeld

Niemegk (German pronunciation: [ˈniːmɛk]) is an abandoned village in the former district of Bitterfeld in Saxony-Anhalt, Germany.

In the 12th century Thimo of Wettin founded a monastic establishment here which served as a Wettin family monastery (Hauskloster).

In 1978 the entire village was demolished to facilitate the excavation of brown coal as the Goitzsche open-cast mine expanded across the entire area. Of the several small settlements destroyed, Niemegk was the largest, with a population of around 2,000. Mining finished in 2004, after which the site of Niemegk was flooded, along with the rest of the Goitzsche mine, to form the present Großer Goitzschesee. The present Niemegker See is a branch of the main body of water lying to the southwest and is used for bathing.

== Notable people ==
Werner Rauh (1913-2000), German botanist.
