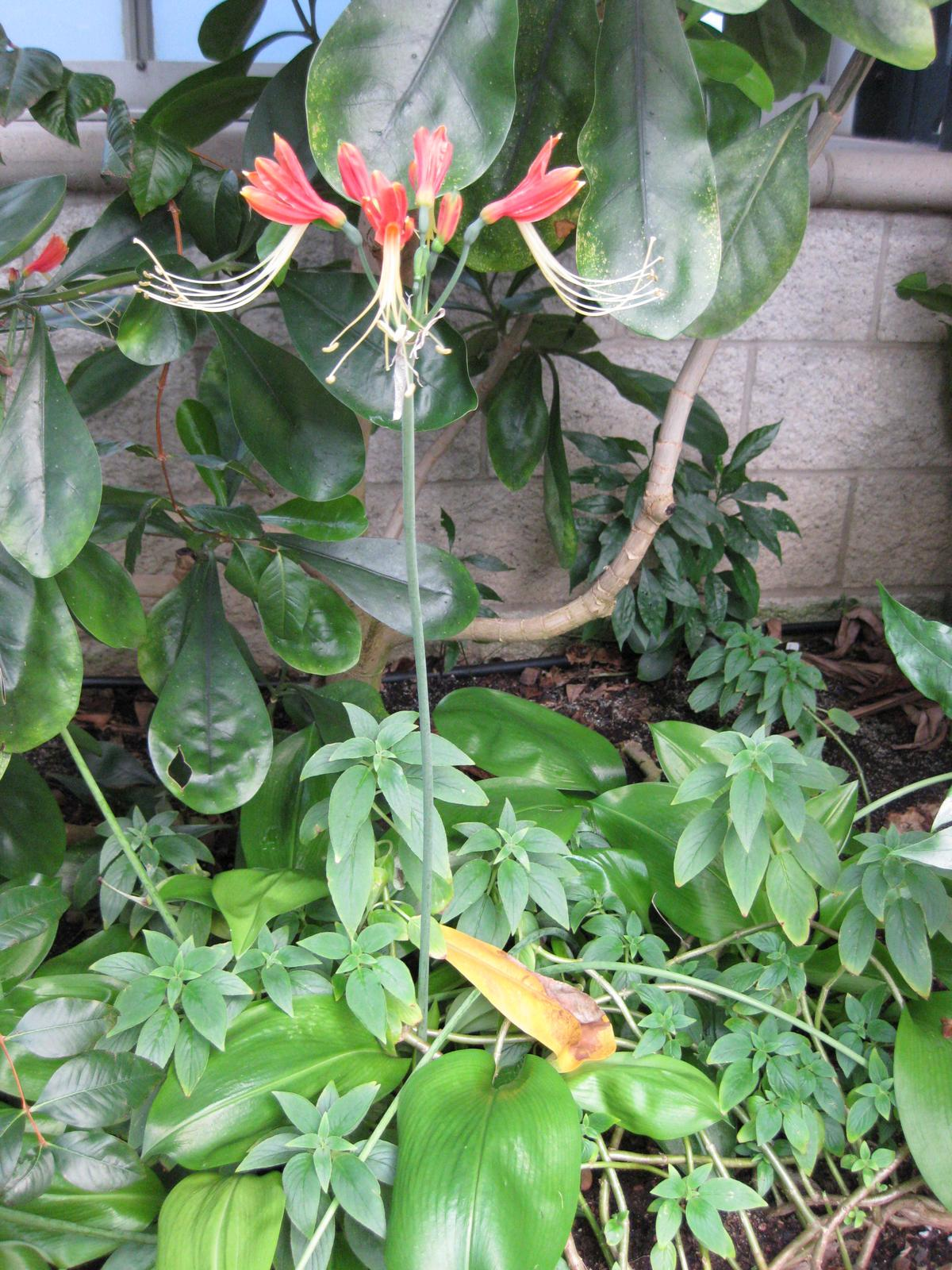

Scientific classification
- Kingdom: Plantae
- Clade: Tracheophytes
- Clade: Angiosperms
- Clade: Monocots
- Order: Asparagales
- Family: Amaryllidaceae
- Subfamily: Amaryllidoideae
- Genus: Eucrosia
- Species: E. bicolor

Binomial name
- Eucrosia bicolor Ker Gawl.

= Eucrosia bicolor =

Species of plant

Eucrosia bicolor is a species of plant found in Ecuador and Peru. Its natural habitats are seasonally dry lowland areas. It was the first species of Eucrosia to be scientifically described, in 1817, and the first to be introduced into cultivation in Europe, flowering outside its homeland for the first time in 1817. It is the most widely grown species of Eucrosia.

It grows from bulbs up to 4.5 cm in diameter. The slightly glaucous leaves, which usually appear by flowering time, have short petioles and blades (laminae) which are 20 cm long by 10 cm wide. The flowers are umbellate, on a stem (scape) up to 60 cm in height, pale red in colour, with stamens with prominent long filaments. The stamens are yellow in the Ecuadorian var. bicolor and red in the Peruvian var. plowmanii.

When grown in cultivation in Europe, it should be kept dry at 10 °C or above when the leaves wither, and watered again when the flowers and leaves begin to appear in spring, when it should be kept in a sunny position.
