= Phaedranassa brevifolia =

Conservation status
- Endangered (IUCN 3.1)

Scientific classification
- Kingdom: Plantae
- Clade: Tracheophytes
- Clade: Angiosperms
- Clade: Monocots
- Order: Asparagales
- Family: Amaryllidaceae
- Subfamily: Amaryllidoideae
- Genus: Phaedranassa
- Species: P. brevifolia

Binomial name
- Phaedranassa brevifolia Meerow

Species of shrub

Phaedranassa brevifolia is a species of flowering plant in the family Amaryllidaceae. It is endemic to Ecuador. Its natural habitat is subtropical or tropical dry shrubland. It is threatened by habitat loss.
