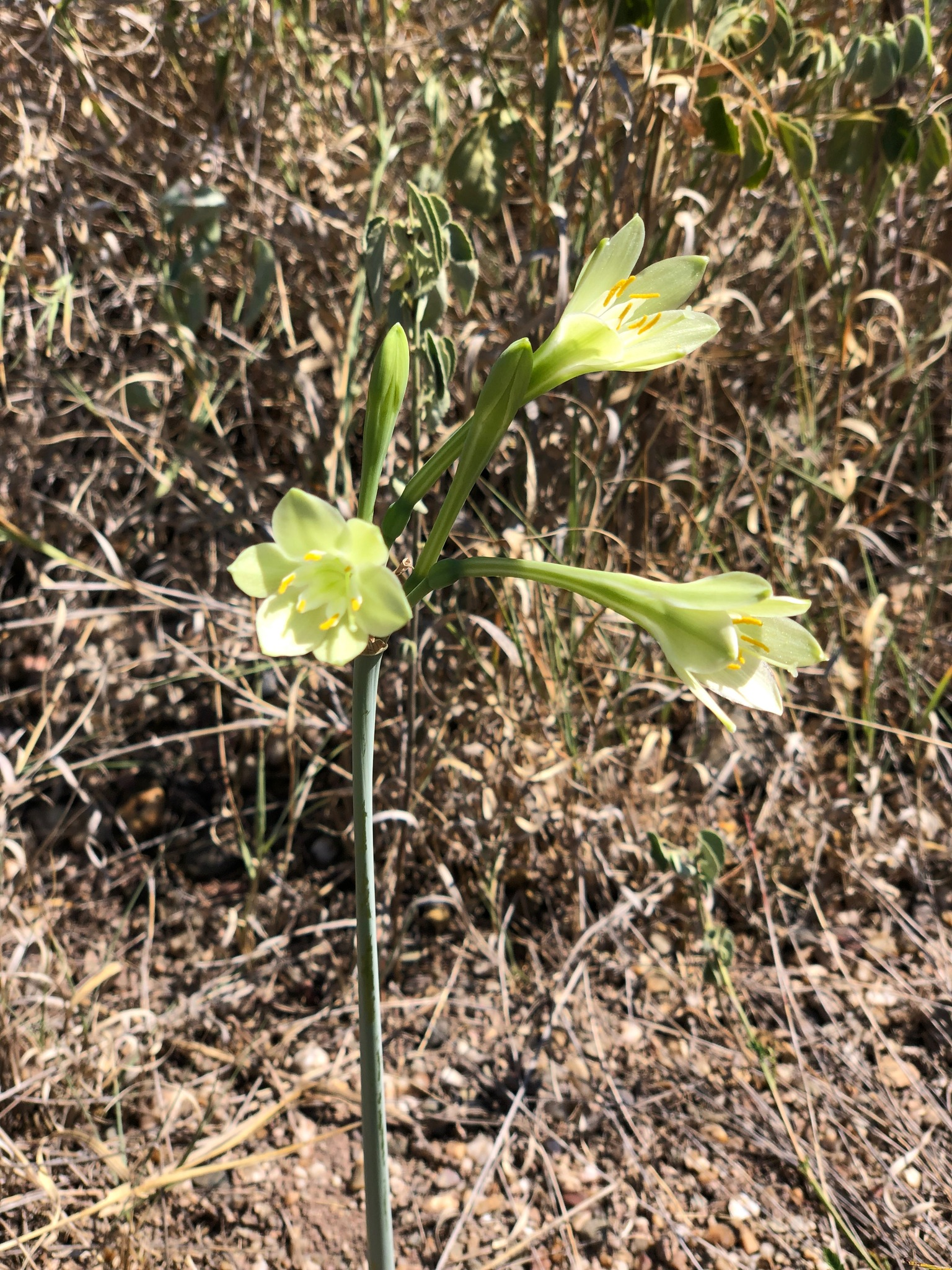

Scientific classification
- Kingdom: Plantae
- Clade: Tracheophytes
- Clade: Angiosperms
- Clade: Monocots
- Order: Asparagales
- Family: Amaryllidaceae
- Subfamily: Amaryllidoideae
- Genus: Stenomesson
- Species: S. chloranthum

Binomial name
- Stenomesson chloranthum Meerow & van der Werff

= Stenomesson chloranthum =

Species of plant

Stenomesson chloranthum is a species of flowering plant in the amaryllis family, Amaryllidaceae. It is endemic to Peru. Alan Meerow and Henk van der Werff the botanists who first formally described the species, named it after its green (Latinized form of Greek χλωρός, khlōrós) flowers (Latinized form of Greek ἄνθος, ánthos).

== Description ==
It is a perennial herb with a round bulb that is 2.5-4 centimeters in diameter. It has 2-3 dull, olive green leaves that are 25-29 by 2-2.5 centimeters with blunt tips. Its inflorescences are on a stem-like stalk that is 30-40 centimeters long. The flowering stalk is 7-8 millimeters in diameter at its base tapering to 5 millimeters at its apex. The flowering stalk is circular and solid in cross section. Its flowers occur in clusters of 5-10 at the top of the stalk. The cluster of flowers is subtended by 2 pale green bracts that are 2.5-3 by 1-1.5 centimeters and come to a point at their tips. The pale green, bell-shaped flowers are 5.8-6.7 centimeters long. The base of the flower is a 3.5-4 centimeter tube that is 2.5-3.1 millimeters wide at the bottom and opens near the top to 8.3-9 millimeters. Atop the floral tube are 6 tepals arranged in two rows. The elliptical outer tepals are 17.7-18.5 by 8-8.5 millimeters and come to a point at their tip. The elliptical inner tepals are 16.8-18.3 by 8.3-8.9 millimeters and have blunt tips. Its flowers have 6 stamens with filaments that are 8.3-8.7 by 2.7-3 millimeters and anthers that are 3 millimeters long. Its flowers have a single thread-like style that is 6 centimeters long and topped by a 3-lobed stigma. Its flowers have an ellipsoid ovary that is 7.5-8 by 4.3-5 millimeters with 3 chambers. Each of the ovary chambers has numerous ovules. Its fruit are conical with numerous black flat seeds that have wings.

== Distribution and habitat ==
Its low elevation habitat, 900 m (3,000 ft), is notable among Peruvian Stenomesson species.

== Reproductive biology ==
The pollen is shed as permanent tetrads.
