= Eucrosia eucrosioides =

Scientific classification
- Kingdom: Plantae
- Clade: Tracheophytes
- Clade: Angiosperms
- Clade: Monocots
- Order: Asparagales
- Family: Amaryllidaceae
- Subfamily: Amaryllidoideae
- Genus: Eucrosia
- Species: E. eucrosioides

Binomial name
- Eucrosia eucrosioides (Herb.) Pax

Synonyms
- Callipsyche eucrosioides Herb.; Callipsyche eucrosioides var. rauhiana Traub; Callipsyche mexicana M.Roem.; Eucrosia eucrosioides var. rauhiana (Traub) Traub

Species of plant

Eucrosia eucrosioides is a species of flowering plant in the family Amaryllidaceae. It is found in south west Ecuador and north Peru. Its natural habitats are seasonally dry lowland areas.

It grows from bulbs 3–4 cm in diameter. The stalked (petiolate) leaves are glaucous and have blades (laminae) 25 cm long by 20 cm wide. The zygomorphic flowers are orange, produced in an umbel; the stamens have prominent long filaments. In its natural habitat, flowering is August to October. The flowers are thought to be adapted for butterfly pollination, but a single report of hummingbird visitation is recorded for this species.

In cultivation, plants should be kept warm and dry when the leaves wither, and watered only when the flowers or leaves begin to grow again, when a sunny position is required.
