= Phaedranassa cinerea =

Conservation status
- Vulnerable (IUCN 3.1)

Scientific classification
- Kingdom: Plantae
- Clade: Tracheophytes
- Clade: Angiosperms
- Clade: Monocots
- Order: Asparagales
- Family: Amaryllidaceae
- Subfamily: Amaryllidoideae
- Genus: Phaedranassa
- Species: P. cinerea

Binomial name
- Phaedranassa cinerea Ravenna

Species of flowering plant

Phaedranassa cinerea is a species of plant that is endemic to Ecuador. Its natural habitat is subtropical or tropical moist montane forests. It is threatened by habitat loss.
