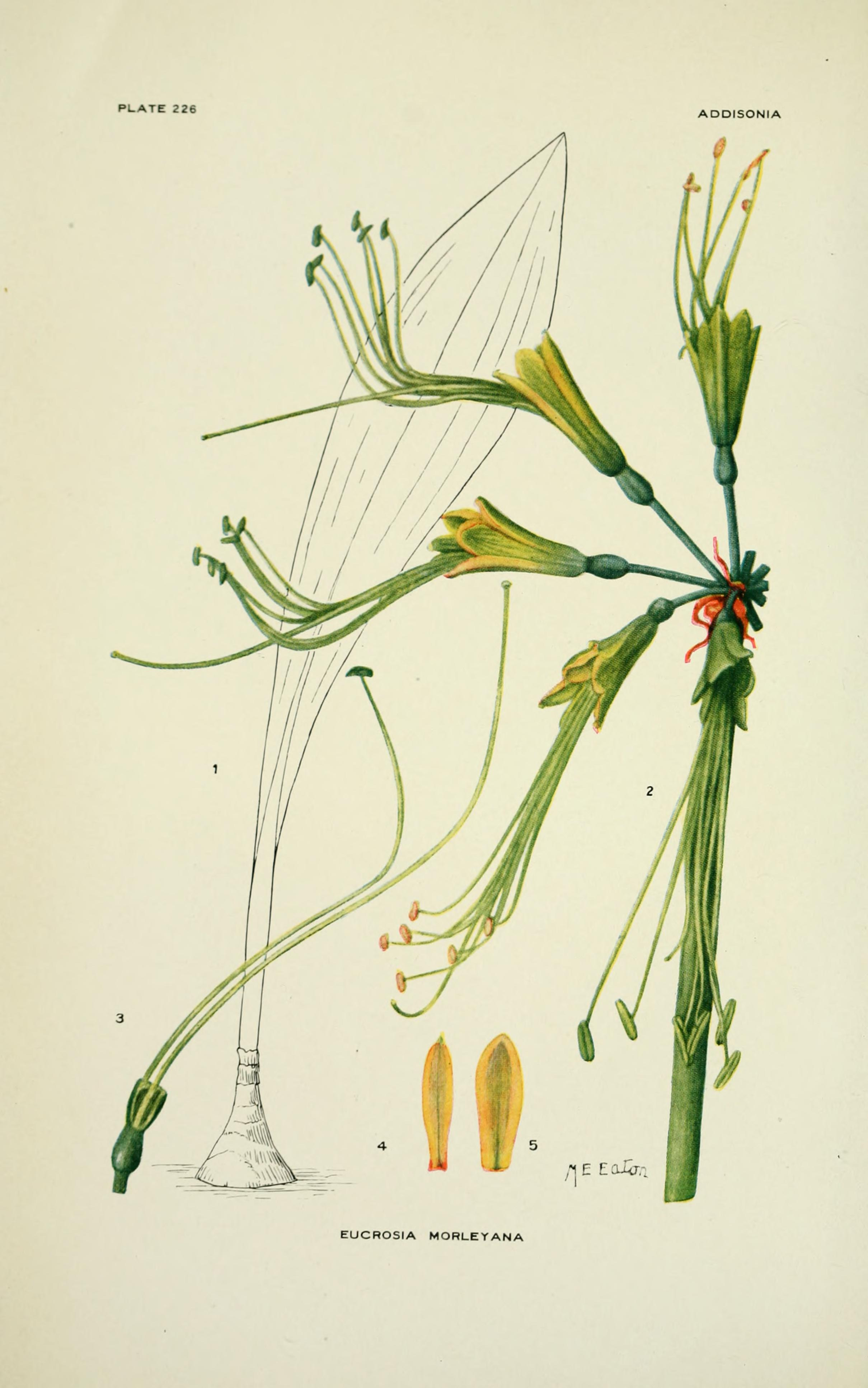

Conservation status
- Endangered (IUCN 3.1)

Scientific classification
- Kingdom: Plantae
- Clade: Embryophytes
- Clade: Tracheophytes
- Clade: Angiosperms
- Clade: Monocots
- Order: Asparagales
- Family: Amaryllidaceae
- Subfamily: Amaryllidoideae
- Genus: Eucrosia
- Species: E. aurantiaca

Binomial name
- Eucrosia aurantiaca (Baker) Pax

Synonyms
- Callipsyche aurantiaca Baker; Eucrosia morleyana Rose

= Eucrosia aurantiaca =

Species of flowering plant

Eucrosia aurantiaca is a species of plant which is endemic to Ecuador. Its natural habitats are subtropical or tropical dry forests and subtropical or tropical dry shrubland. It is threatened by habitat loss.

It grows from bulbs 10 cm long and 7–8 cm in diameter. There are usually two stalked (petiolate) leaves, blue-green in colour, with a blade (lamina) which is 40 cm long and 20–25 cm wide. The leaves do not appear until after flowering. The flowers are umbellate, on a stalk (scape) up to 1m in length, yellow, with stamens with prominent long filaments.

In cultivation, plants should be kept warm and dry when the leaves wither, and watered only when the flowers or leaves begin to grow again, when a sunny position is required.
