= Stenomesson korsakoffii =

Scientific classification
- Kingdom: Plantae
- Clade: Tracheophytes
- Clade: Angiosperms
- Clade: Monocots
- Order: Asparagales
- Family: Amaryllidaceae
- Subfamily: Amaryllidoideae
- Genus: Stenomesson
- Species: S. korsakoffii

Binomial name
- Stenomesson korsakoffii (Traub) Meerow

Synonyms
- Caliphruria korsakoffii (Traub) Meerow; Eucharis korsakoffii Traub; Urceolina korsakoffii (Traub) Traub

Species of plant

Stenomesson korsakoffii is a species of plant in the family Amaryllidaceae native to Peru. It was formerly known as Caliphruria korsakoffii and Urceolina korsakoffii. A 2020 molecular phylogenetic study indicated that this species is sister to the other species of Stenomesson.
