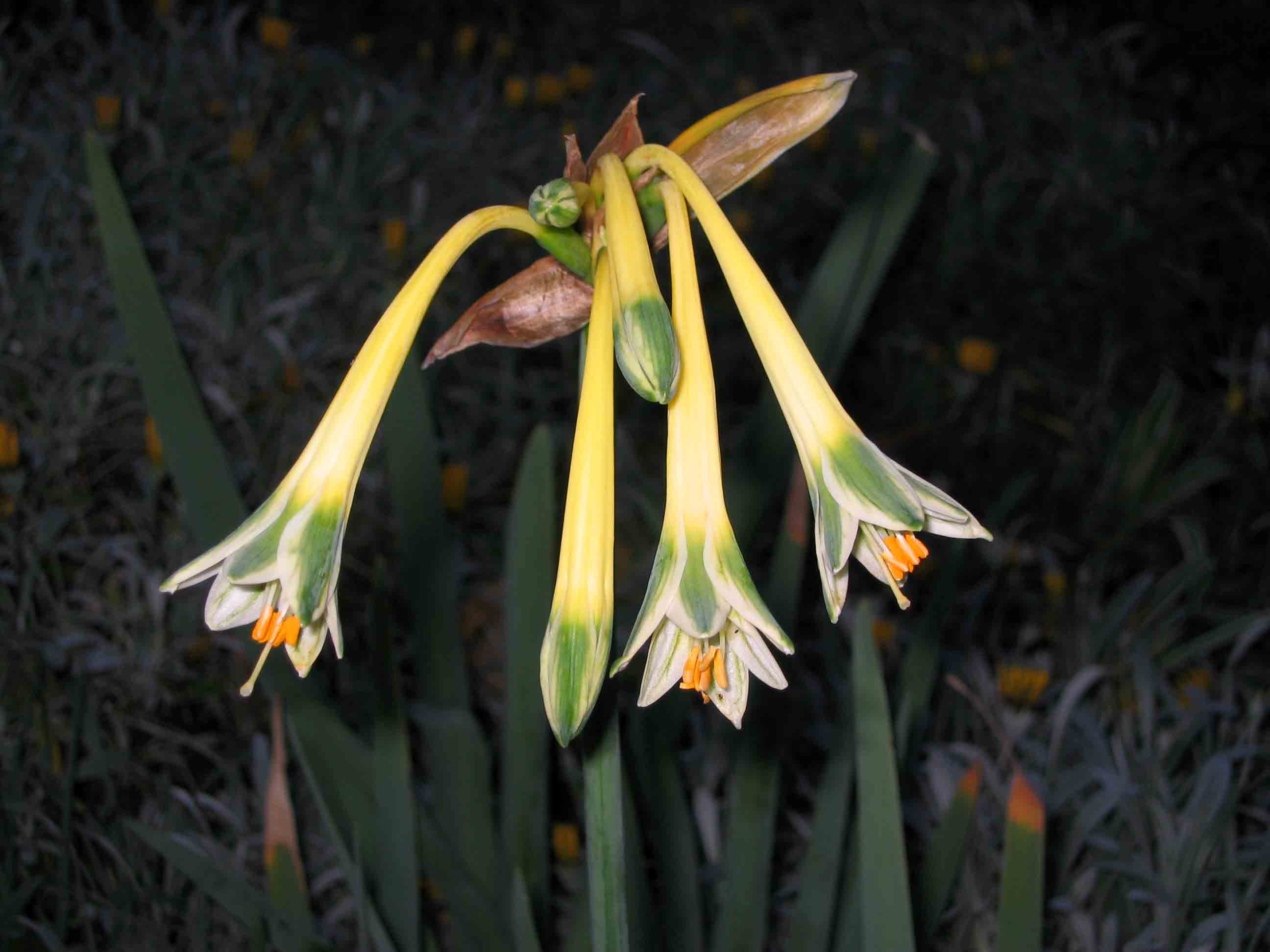
- Clinanthus variegatus

Scientific classification
- Kingdom: Plantae
- Clade: Tracheophytes
- Clade: Angiosperms
- Clade: Monocots
- Order: Asparagales
- Family: Amaryllidaceae
- Subfamily: Amaryllidoideae
- Genus: Clinanthus; Herb.

Type species
- Clinanthus luteus Herb.

Species
- See list.

Synonyms
- Carpodetes Herb.; Coburgia Sweet; Crocopsis Pax; Neaera Salisb.

= Clinanthus =

Clinanthus Temporal range: 24.18 –0 Ma Late Oligocene – Recent

Genus of flowering plants

Clinanthus is a genus of bulbous plants in the family Amaryllidaceae. It is found in western South America, including Ecuador, Peru, Bolivia, north Chile and north west Argentina.

== Description ==
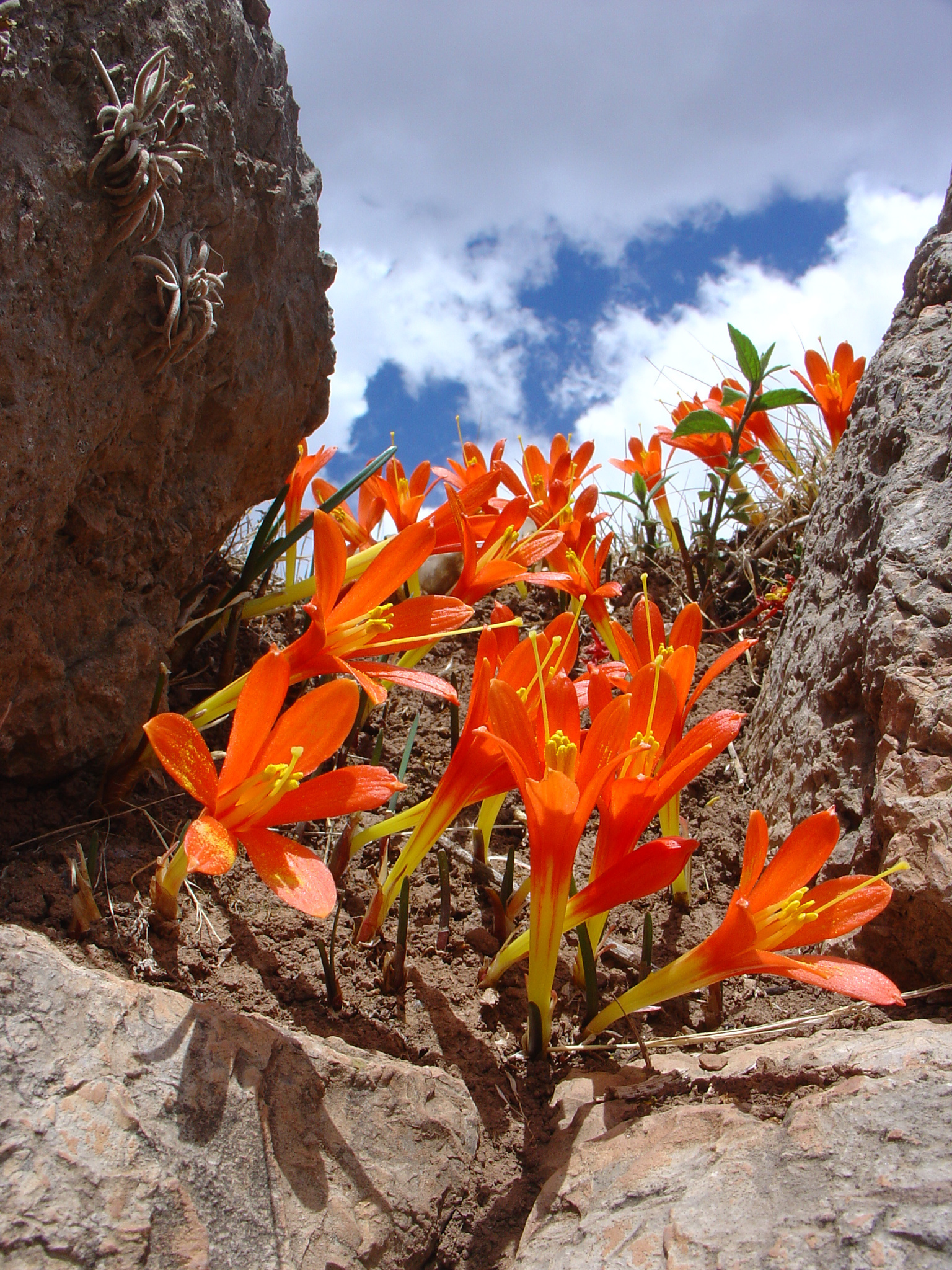
Clinanthus humilis

=== Vegetative characteristics ===
Clinanthus are perennial herbs with sessile, linear to lorate, up to 50–60 cm long leaves.

=== Generative characteristics ===
The inflorescences have 2–10 mostly pink or red flowers. The androecium consists of 6 stamens. The gynoecium consists of 3 carpels. The stigma is capitate. The trilocular, green or glaucous capsule fruit bears numerous brown to black, winged, flat seeds.

== Taxonomy ==
It was published by William Herbert in 1821 with Clinanthus luteus Herb. as the type species.

=== Species ===
Species include:

- Clinanthus callacallensis (Ravenna) Meerow
- Clinanthus campodensis (Ravenna) Meerow
- Clinanthus caracensis (Ravenna) Meerow
- Clinanthus chihuanhuayu (Cárdenas) Meerow
- Clinanthus coccineus (Ruiz & Pav.) Meerow
- Clinanthus croceus (Savigny) Meerow
- Clinanthus elwesii (Baker) Meerow
- Clinanthus flammidus (Ravenna) Meerow
- Clinanthus fulvus (Herb.) Meerow
- Clinanthus glareosus (Ravenna) Meerow
- Clinanthus humilis (Herb.) Meerow
- Clinanthus imasumacc (Vargas) Meerow
- Clinanthus incarnatus (Kunth) Meerow
- Clinanthus incarum (Kraenzl.) Meerow
- Clinanthus luteus Herb.
- Clinanthus macleanicus (Herb.) Meerow
- Clinanthus microstephium (Ravenna) Meerow
- Clinanthus mirabilis (Ravenna) Meerow
- Clinanthus recurvatus (Ruiz & Pav.) Meerow
- Clinanthus sunchubambae (Ravenna) Meerow
- Clinanthus variegatus (Ruiz & Pav.) Meerow
- Clinanthus viridiflorus (Ruiz & Pav.) Meerow

== Ecology ==
=== Habitat ===
Clinanthus occurs in seasonally dry shrubland or grassy vegetation at elevations above 2000 m above sea level.

=== Pollination ===
The flowers are possibly ornithophilous (i.e., bird pollinated).
