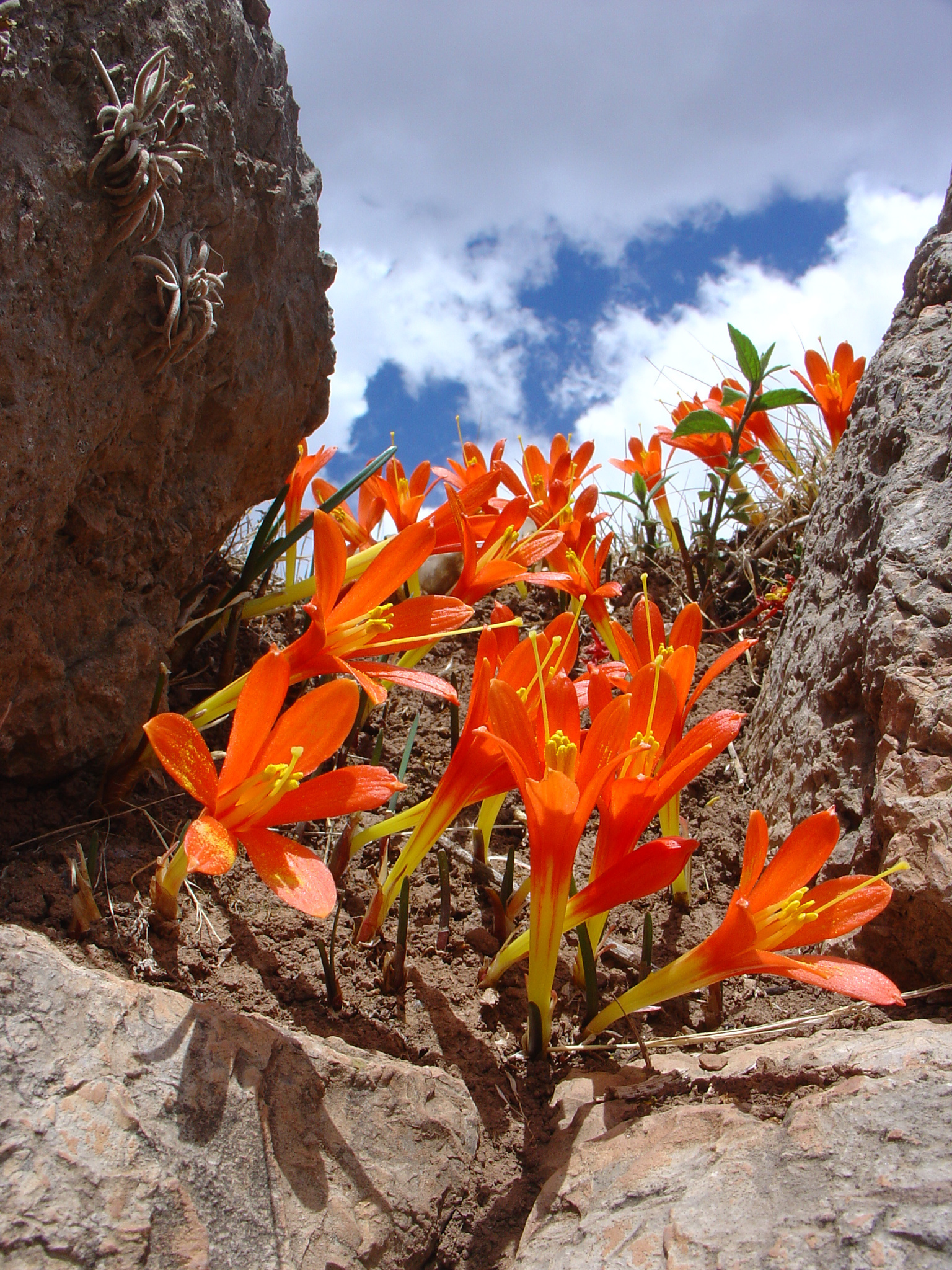

Scientific classification
- Kingdom: Plantae
- Clade: Tracheophytes
- Clade: Angiosperms
- Clade: Monocots
- Order: Asparagales
- Family: Amaryllidaceae
- Subfamily: Amaryllidoideae
- Genus: Clinanthus
- Species: C. humilis

Binomial name
- Clinanthus humilis (Herb.) Meerow

Synonyms
- Clitanthes humilis Herb.; Coburgia humilis (Herb.) Herb.; Stenomesson humile (Herb.) Baker; Crocopsis argentinum Pax; Crocopsis fulgens Pax; Haylockia pseudocolchicu (Kraenzl.) H.H.Hume; Stenomesson acaule Kraenzl.; Zephyranthes pseudocolchicum Kraenzl.

= Clinanthus humilis =

Species of plant

Clinanthus humilis is a species of flowering plant in the family Amaryllidaceae. It is a perennial herb native to Peru, Bolivia, northern Chile and north-western Argentina.
