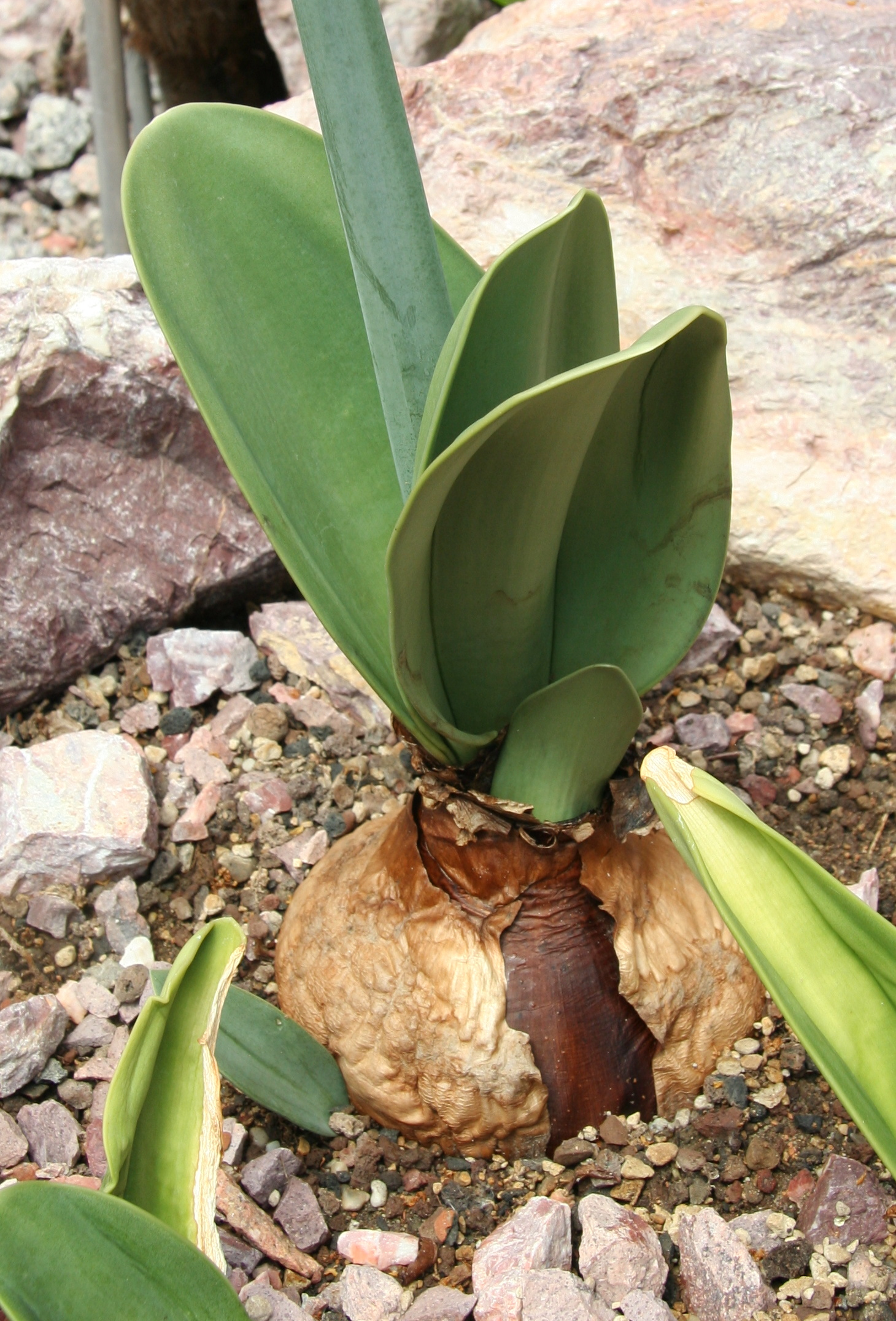
- Rauhia multiflora

Scientific classification
- Kingdom: Plantae
- Clade: Tracheophytes
- Clade: Angiosperms
- Clade: Monocots
- Order: Asparagales
- Family: Amaryllidaceae
- Subfamily: Amaryllidoideae
- Tribe: Eucharideae
- Genus: Rauhia; Traub

Type species
- Rauhia peruviana Traub
- It is endemic to Peru

= Rauhia =

Species of plant

Rauhia is a genus of bulbous, perennial plants in the family Amaryllidaceae endemic to Peru.

== Description ==
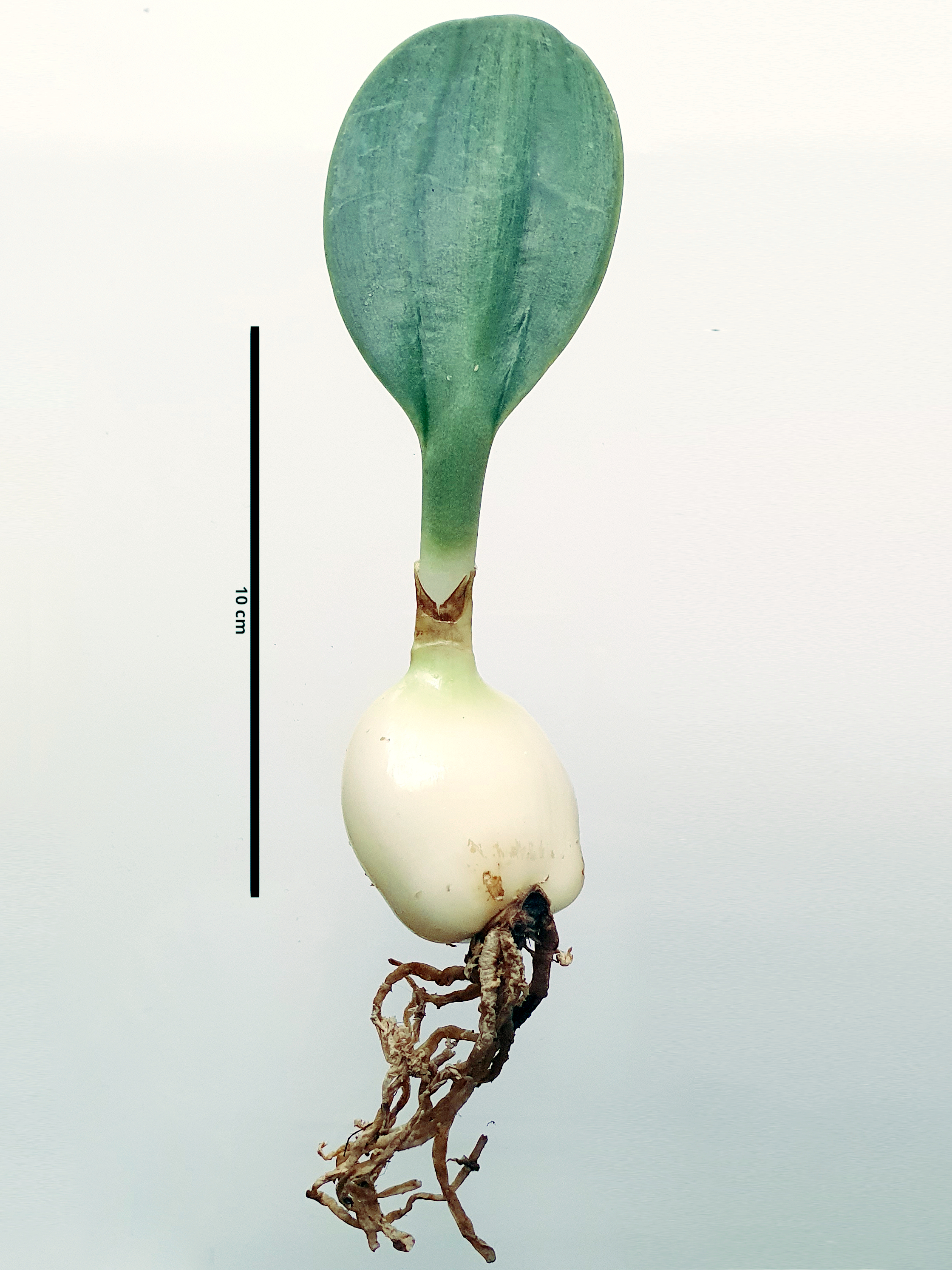
Rauhia multiflora bulb with scale bar (10 cm)

=== Vegetative characteristics ===
Rauhia are bulbous, perennial plants with annual, ovate to oblong, fleshy, petiolate, glaucous leaves and large, solitary, tunicate, underground bulbs.

=== Generative characteristics ===
The stout, umbellate inflorescences with erect, solid scapes bear numerous pedicellate, infundibular to tubular, actinomorphic or zygomorphic, green to white flowers. The seeds are black or brown.

== Cytology ==
The diploid chromosome count is 2n = 46.

== Taxonomy ==
It was published by Hamilton Paul Traub in 1957 with Rauhia peruviana Traub as the type species.

=== Species ===
As of June 2023, Plants of the World Online accepted the following species:

- Rauhia albescens Meerow & Sagást.
- Rauhia decora Ravenna - Peru (Amazonas)
- Rauhia multiflora (Kunth) Ravenna - Peru (Cajamarca)
- Rauhia occidentalis Ravenna - Peru (Cajamarca)
- Rauhia staminosa Ravenna - Peru (Amazonas)

== Etymology ==
The generic name Rauhia refers to the German botanist Werner Rauh (1913-2000).

== Ecology ==
It occurs on rocky slopes, and in open, seasonally dry woodlands at elevations of 1000–1500 m.

== Cultivation ==
Rauhia multiflora is found in cultivation. Rauhia has been successfully used in intergeneric hybridisation with Eucrosia.
