= Clinanthus elwesii =

Scientific classification
- Kingdom: Plantae
- Clade: Tracheophytes
- Clade: Angiosperms
- Clade: Monocots
- Order: Asparagales
- Family: Amaryllidaceae
- Subfamily: Amaryllidoideae
- Genus: Clinanthus
- Species: C. elwesii

Binomial name
- Clinanthus elwesii (Baker) Meerow

Synonyms
- Anax elwesii (Baker) Ravenna; Callithauma viridiflorum var. elwesii Baker; Stenomesson elwesii (Baker) J.F.Macbr.

Species of plant

Clinanthus elwesii is a species of plant in the family Amaryllidaceae. It is native to Peru. John Gilbert Baker, the English botanist who first formally described the species using the synonymous name Callithauma viridiflorum var. elwesii, named it in after Henry John Elwes, another English botanist who grew the specimen Baker examined.

== Description ==
A herbaceous plant. Prominent characteristics include flowers with a corolla which consists of six connate tepals.

=== Reproductive biology ===
The pollen of C. elwesii is shed as permanent tetrads.
