= Stenomesson tubiflorum =

Scientific classification
- Kingdom: Plantae
- Clade: Tracheophytes
- Clade: Angiosperms
- Clade: Monocots
- Order: Asparagales
- Family: Amaryllidaceae
- Subfamily: Amaryllidoideae
- Genus: Stenomesson
- Species: S. tubiflorum

Binomial name
- Stenomesson tubiflorum (Meerow) Meerow

Synonyms
- Eucrosia tubiflora Meerow

Species of plant

Stenomesson tubiflorum is a species of flowering plant in the family Amaryllidaceae. It is endemic to Peru.

S. tubiflorum, which was scientifically named in 1985 as Eucrosia tubiflora, is known only from the type collection in the Marañón basin, an area which had not been explored recently as of 2006. Like other species of dry habitats, it produces leaves and flowers seasonally and therefore may go unnoticed.
