= Eucrosia stricklandii =

Conservation status
- Vulnerable (IUCN 3.1)

Scientific classification
- Kingdom: Plantae
- Clade: Tracheophytes
- Clade: Angiosperms
- Clade: Monocots
- Order: Asparagales
- Family: Amaryllidaceae
- Subfamily: Amaryllidoideae
- Genus: Eucrosia
- Species: E. stricklandii

Binomial name
- Eucrosia stricklandii (Baker) Meerow

Species of flowering plant

Eucrosia stricklandii is a species of plant which is endemic to Ecuador. Its natural habitats are subtropical or tropical dry forests and subtropical or tropical dry shrubland. It is threatened by habitat loss.

It grows from bulbs around 4 cm in diameter. The stalked (petiolate) leaves have blades (laminae) 20 cm long by 11 cm wide. The zygomorphic flowers are produced in an umbel on a 40 cm tall stem (scape) and are red in var. stricklandii, pink in var. montana. The stamens have prominent long filaments.

In cultivation, plants should be kept warm and dry when the leaves wither, and watered only when the flowers or leaves begin to grow again, when a sunny position is required.
