= Werner Rauh =

German botanist

Werner Rauh (16 May 1913 in Niemegk – 7 April 2000 in Heidelberg) was a German biologist, botanist and author.

== Biography ==
Born in the town of Niemegk, Saxony-Anhalt near Bitterfeld, Rauh studied at the Biology faculty at the University of Halle under the morphologist Wilhelm Troll, and received his doctorate in Botany in 1937 before being appointed to the University of Heidelberg two years later. In 1937, Rauh was contacted by Wilhelm Schäfer (1912–1981) to work in Tibet on a zoological expedition, but on the condition that he would have to become a member of the SS. He turned down the offer. He discovered or described some 1200 genera, species and varieties of plants from Africa, the Americas and Asia. His fields of specialization were the bromeliads and succulent plants. He was a professor at the University of Heidelberg and Director of the Institute of Plant Systematics and Plant Geography as well as Director of the Heidelberg Botanical Gardens, and authored over 300 scholarly books and articles. His work on the succulent and xerophytic flora of Madagascar is presented in his two-volume work Succulent and Xerophytic Plants of Madagascar in 1995 and 1998.

He was honoured in the names of several flowering plants; in 1956, Curt Backeberg published Rauhocereus Backeb. (in the Cactaceae family), then Rauhia Traub (in the Amaryllidaceae family) was published in 1957 by Hamilton Paul Traub. Rauhiella Pabst & Braga was published in 1978 (Orchidaceae) by Guido Frederico João Pabst and Pedro Ivo Soares Braga, then lastly Werauhia J.R.Grant (Bromeliaceae family) was published in 1995 by Jason Randall Grant.

== Selected publications ==
- Kakteen an ihren Standorten, 1979, ISBN 3-489-51924-8
- Die 100 schönsten Kakteen, Humboldt-Taschenbuchverlag, 1980, ISBN 3-581-66370-8
- Die großartige Welt der Sukkulenten, 1979
- Schöne Kakteen und andere Sukkulenten, 1967
- Bromelien - Tillandsien und andere kulturwürdige Bromelien, Verlag Eugen Ulmer, Stuttgart 1990, ISBN 3-8001-6371-3
- Succulent and Xerophytic Plants of Madagascar, Vol. 1 + 2, Strawberry Press, 1995 + 1998, ISBN 0-912647-14-0

== Expeditions ==
- 1950: Morocco
- 1954: Peru, Ecuador
- 1956: Peru
- 1959/1960: Madagascar, Tasmania, Kenya
- 1961: Madagascar, South Africa
- 1963: Madagascar, Comoros
- 1964: South Africa
- 1966: Mexico
- 1967: Peru
- 1968: South Africa
- 1969: Madagascar, Comoros
- 1970: Peru, Mexico
- 1971: USA
- 1973: Ecuador, Galapagos Islands Peru, Brazil
- 1974: Mexico
- 1975: Brazil, Colombia, Ecuador, Peru, Panama
- 1976: Peru, Bolivia, Chile
- 1977: USA Guatemala, Costa Rica, Panama
- 1978: Indonesia, Papua New Guinea, Philippines
- 1979: Namibia, South Africa
- 1980: Mexico, Peru, Ecuador
- 1981: Brazil
- 1982: USA, Panama, Dominican Republic
- 1983: Ecuador, Peru, Argentina
- 1984: Venezuela, Dominican Republic, Panama
- 1985: USA, Mexico, Peru
- 1986: Brazil
- 1994: Madagascar
