= Serrana =

Serrana may refer to:

== Places ==
- Serrana, São Paulo, a city in Brazil
- Serrana (Santa Catarina), a mesoregion in Brazil
- Serrana Bank, an atoll off the coast of Colombia

== Organisms ==
- Clystea serrana, a moth of family Erebidae
- Cochylis serrana, a moth of family Tortricidae
- Cupanoscelis serrana, a beetle of family Cerambycidae
- Geocerthia serrana, a bird of family Furnariidae
- Justicia serrana, a plant of family Acanthaceae
- Neocompsa serrana, a beetle of family Cerambycidae
- Potiatuca serrana, a beetle of family Cerambycidae
- Vriesea serrana, a plant of family Bromeliaceae

== People ==
- Serrana Fernández (born 1973), Uruguayan swimmer
- Elisa Serrana (1930–2012), Chilean writer

== Other uses ==
- Serrana (composition), a solo guitar etude by Jason Becker
