= Antonello Palombi =

Italian operatic tenor (1968–2026)

- Palombi, in 2017
- Born: 7 July 1968; Spoleto, Italy
- Died: 9 November 2026 (aged 58); Mainz, Rhineland-Palatinate, Germany
- Occupation: Operatic tenor
- Years active: 1990–2026
- Organizations: Staatstheater Mainz
- Website: liricopera.com

Antonello Palombi (7 July 1968 – 9 November 2026) was an Italian operatic tenor who appeared at major opera houses in Europe and the United States. He performed spinto roles of the Italian repertoire such as Radamès in Verdi's Aida and took on dramatic roles, especially Otello. Palombi was in the international press in 2006 when he stepped in at La Scala in Milan as Radames without time to change to a costume. He was based at the Staatstheater Mainz from 2023 on.

== Life and career ==
Palombi was born in Spoleto on 7 July 1968. He joined the Carabinieri, Italy's paramilitary police force, at age 20 (his father was also in the Carabinieri). While stationed in Perugia and Florence, he also sang in the cathedral choir of Todi. At the suggestion of the choirmaster there, he decided to study singing seriously. He took private lessons with Katy Gamberucci and Claude Thiolas. In 1990 he made his debut as Pinkerton in Puccini's Madama Butterfly in Fürth, Germany. He appeared at the Teatro Verdi in Pisa, in 1994 as Macduff in Verdi's Macbeth and as Ramiro in Rossini's La Cenerentola, and in 1995 as Nemorino in Donizetti's L'elisir d'amore. He moved on from these lighter roles to spinto tenor roles.

His voice has been described as full and resonant, with "a robust middle register and ringing high notes", but also capable of softness and nuance. In 1997 he appeared as Edmondo in Puccini's Manon Lescaut at the Glyndebourne Festival, conducted by John Eliot Gardiner, which was recorded on DVD. In 1999, he stepped in there in the lead role as Des Grieux in the same opera, which he repeated in 1999. In 1998 he first performed as Cavaradossi in Puccini's Tosca and Radamès in Verdi's Aida in Venice. At the Teatro Regio in Turin, he appeared in 1999 as Pinkerton, in 2000 as Loris Ipanov in Giordano's Fedora, and as Pollione in Bellini's Norma and as Faust in Boito's Mefistofele in 2002. He portrayed Don José in Bizet's Carmen at the New National Theatre Tokyo in 1999. He appeared as Adorno in Verdi's Simon Boccanegra at the Teatro Bellini in Catania, and in 2001 in Verdi's I due Foscari at the Teatro dell'Opera di Roma and as Des Grieux at La Fenice in Venice, in 2002 as Cassio at the Opernhaus Zürich, and in 2003 in Alfredo Keil's Serrana at the Teatro Nacional de São Carlos in Lisbon. He performed as Des Grieux at the Bavarian State Opera in Munich from 2002 to 2004.

Palombi made his American debut in 2004 as Dick Johnson in Puccini's La fanciulla del West at the Seattle Opera. He portrayed Verdi's Otello, after long and diligent preparation, first in Melbourne, and later at the Deutsche Oper Berlin. It became one of his signature roles. On 10 December 2006, he caused a media sensation, when Franco Zeffirelli's new production of Aida at La Scala in Milan opened the theatre's 2006–2007 season, and during the second night of the run, tenor Roberto Alagna walked off the stage after booing from the gallery; Palombi, his understudy, took over the role, with no time to change clothes and therefore in jeans and a black shirt. He returned in costume after the intermission. He proved to be prepared to face "a particularly complex challenge". Palombi returned to the company as Luigi in Puccini's Il tabarro in 2008 and as Canio in Leoncavallo's Pagliacci in 2011. He made his debut at the Metropolitan Opera in New York City in 2014, again as Radames, another signature role.

He appeared in the U.S. as Canio at Dallas Opera and Palm Beach Opera, as Radames at the Michigan Opera Theatre, and as Cavaradossi at Cincinnati Opera. He performed as Faust in Boito's Mefistofele in Pisa and in Tokyo, as Luigi in Il tabarro at the Teatro dell'Opera di Roma, directed by Damiano Michieletto and conducted by Daniele Rustioni, as Radames at the Teatro di San Carlo in Naples conducted by Pinchas Steinberg, as Alvaro in Verdi's La forza del destino and Otello at the Genova Opera conducted by Andrea Battistoni and in Perth, Tokyo, Stadttheater Klagenfurt and in Athens. He performed as Radames at in New Zealand and in a new production in Teatro Comunale di Bologna, directed by Francesco Micheli and conducted by Frédéric Chaslin. He portrayed Giordano's Andrea Chénier at the Liceu in Barcelona, conducted by Steinberg, Cavaradossi at the Teatro Lirico di Cagliari, Calàf in Puccini's Turandot in Bologna and Opéra de Marseille.

From 2023 Palombi was a member of the Staatstheater Mainz, where he appeared in key roles such as Calàf, Otello, Des Grieux in Manon Lescaut and Canio. He also coached young singers and the opera chorus there.

=== Personal life ===
Palombi was married to Gabriella; the couple had two children.

Palombi died in Mainz in November 2026, at the age of 58. After failing to show up at a rehearsal on 9 November, he was found dead in his hotel room.
