= Clystea fulvicauda =

Scientific classification
- Domain: Eukaryota
- Kingdom: Animalia
- Phylum: Arthropoda
- Class: Insecta
- Order: Lepidoptera
- Superfamily: Noctuoidea
- Family: Erebidae
- Subfamily: Arctiinae
- Genus: Clystea
- Species: C. fulvicauda

Binomial name
- Clystea fulvicauda (Butler, 1896)

Synonyms
- Eunomia fulvicauda Butler, 1876

Species of moth

Clystea fulvicauda is a moth of the subfamily Arctiinae. It was described by Arthur Gardiner Butler in 1896. It is found in São Paulo, Brazil.
