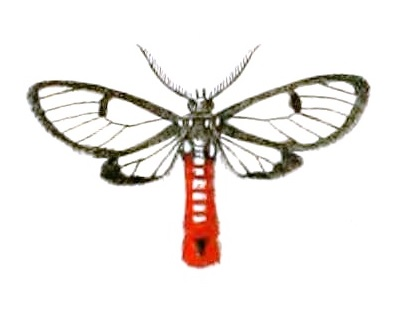

Scientific classification
- Domain: Eukaryota
- Kingdom: Animalia
- Phylum: Arthropoda
- Class: Insecta
- Order: Lepidoptera
- Superfamily: Noctuoidea
- Family: Erebidae
- Subfamily: Arctiinae
- Genus: Clystea
- Species: C. sarcosoma

Binomial name
- Clystea sarcosoma (Butler, 1876)

Synonyms
- Eunomia sarcosoma Butler, 1876; Dinia laudamia Druce, 1890

= Clystea sarcosoma =

Species of moth

Clystea sarcosoma is a moth of the subfamily Arctiinae. It was described by Arthur Gardiner Butler in 1876. It is found in Colombia.
