= Clystea carnicauda =

Scientific classification
- Domain: Eukaryota
- Kingdom: Animalia
- Phylum: Arthropoda
- Class: Insecta
- Order: Lepidoptera
- Superfamily: Noctuoidea
- Family: Erebidae
- Subfamily: Arctiinae
- Genus: Clystea
- Species: C. carnicauda

Binomial name
- Clystea carnicauda (Butler, 1876)

Synonyms
- Eunomia carnicauda Butler, 1876; Clystea innotata Schaus, 1904

Species of moth

Clystea carnicauda is a moth of the subfamily Arctiinae. It was described by Arthur Gardiner Butler in 1876. It is found in Trinidad and Brazil.
