= Neocompsa glaphyra =

Scientific classification
- Kingdom: Animalia
- Phylum: Arthropoda
- Class: Insecta
- Order: Coleoptera
- Suborder: Polyphaga
- Infraorder: Cucujiformia
- Family: Cerambycidae
- Genus: Neocompsa
- Species: N. glaphyra

Binomial name
- Neocompsa glaphyra Martins, 1970

Species of beetle

Neocompsa glaphyra is a species of beetle in the family Cerambycidae. It was described by Martins in 1970.
