= Neocompsa albopilosa =

Scientific classification
- Kingdom: Animalia
- Phylum: Arthropoda
- Class: Insecta
- Order: Coleoptera
- Suborder: Polyphaga
- Infraorder: Cucujiformia
- Family: Cerambycidae
- Genus: Neocompsa
- Species: N. albopilosa

Binomial name
- Neocompsa albopilosa (Martins, 1962)

Species of beetle

Neocompsa albopilosa is a species of beetle in the family Cerambycidae. It was described by Martins in 1962.
