= Clystea dorsilineata =

Scientific classification
- Kingdom: Animalia
- Phylum: Arthropoda
- Class: Insecta
- Order: Lepidoptera
- Superfamily: Noctuoidea
- Family: Erebidae
- Subfamily: Arctiinae
- Genus: Clystea
- Species: C. dorsilineata

Binomial name
- Clystea dorsilineata (Hampson, 1898)

Synonyms
- Aethria dorsilineata Hampson, 1898; Aethria dorsolineata

Species of moth

Clystea dorsilineata is a moth of the subfamily Arctiinae. It was described by George Hampson in 1898. It is found on Jamaica and Cuba.
