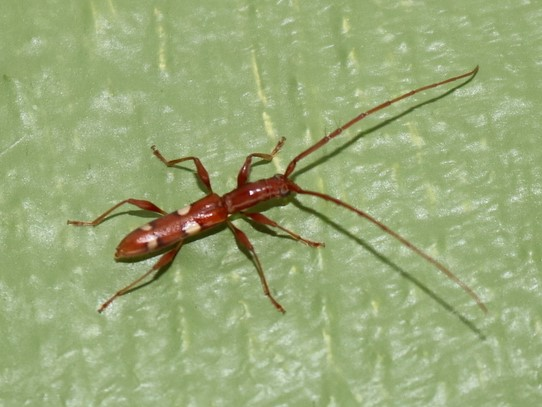

Scientific classification
- Kingdom: Animalia
- Phylum: Arthropoda
- Class: Insecta
- Order: Coleoptera
- Suborder: Polyphaga
- Infraorder: Cucujiformia
- Family: Cerambycidae
- Genus: Neocompsa
- Species: N. alacris

Binomial name
- Neocompsa alacris (Bates, 1885)

= Neocompsa alacris =

Species of beetle

Neocompsa alacris is a species of beetle in the family Cerambycidae. It was described by Bates in 1885.
