= Neocompsa aspasia =

Scientific classification
- Kingdom: Animalia
- Phylum: Arthropoda
- Class: Insecta
- Order: Coleoptera
- Suborder: Polyphaga
- Infraorder: Cucujiformia
- Family: Cerambycidae
- Genus: Neocompsa
- Species: N. aspasia

Binomial name
- Neocompsa aspasia Martins, 1974

Species of beetle

Neocompsa aspasia is a species of beetle in the family Cerambycidae. It was described by Martins in 1974.
