= Clystea andromacha =

Scientific classification
- Domain: Eukaryota
- Kingdom: Animalia
- Phylum: Arthropoda
- Class: Insecta
- Order: Lepidoptera
- Superfamily: Noctuoidea
- Family: Erebidae
- Subfamily: Arctiinae
- Genus: Clystea
- Species: C. andromacha

Binomial name
- Clystea andromacha (Fabricius, 1775)

Synonyms
- Zygaena andromacha Fabricius, 1775; Eunomia sanguiflua Geyer, 1832; Glaucopis finalis Walker, 1854; Eunomia pennata Möschler, 1878; Clystea andromacha f. rubra Draudt, 1915

Species of moth

Clystea andromacha is a moth of the subfamily Arctiinae. It was described by Johan Christian Fabricius in 1775. It is found in Venezuela and Brazil.
