= Clystea sanctula =

Scientific classification
- Domain: Eukaryota
- Kingdom: Animalia
- Phylum: Arthropoda
- Class: Insecta
- Order: Lepidoptera
- Superfamily: Noctuoidea
- Family: Erebidae
- Subfamily: Arctiinae
- Genus: Clystea
- Species: C. sanctula

Binomial name
- Clystea sanctula Dognin, 1911

Species of moth

Clystea sanctula is a moth of the subfamily Arctiinae. It was described by Paul Dognin in 1911. It is found in Brazil.
