= Clystea platyzona =

Scientific classification
- Domain: Eukaryota
- Kingdom: Animalia
- Phylum: Arthropoda
- Class: Insecta
- Order: Lepidoptera
- Superfamily: Noctuoidea
- Family: Erebidae
- Subfamily: Arctiinae
- Genus: Clystea
- Species: C. platyzona

Binomial name
- Clystea platyzona (Felder, 1874)

Synonyms
- Scytale platyzona Felder, 1874; Aethria restricta Dognin, 1923

Species of moth

Clystea platyzona is a moth of the subfamily Arctiinae. It was described by Felder in 1869. It is found in Colombia.
