= Potiatuca carioca =

Scientific classification
- Kingdom: Animalia
- Phylum: Arthropoda
- Class: Insecta
- Order: Coleoptera
- Suborder: Polyphaga
- Infraorder: Cucujiformia
- Family: Cerambycidae
- Genus: Potiatuca
- Species: P. carioca

Binomial name
- Potiatuca carioca Monne & Monne, 2009

Species of beetle

Potiatuca carioca is a species of beetle in the family Cerambycidae. It was described by Monne and Monne in 2009. It is known from Brazil.
