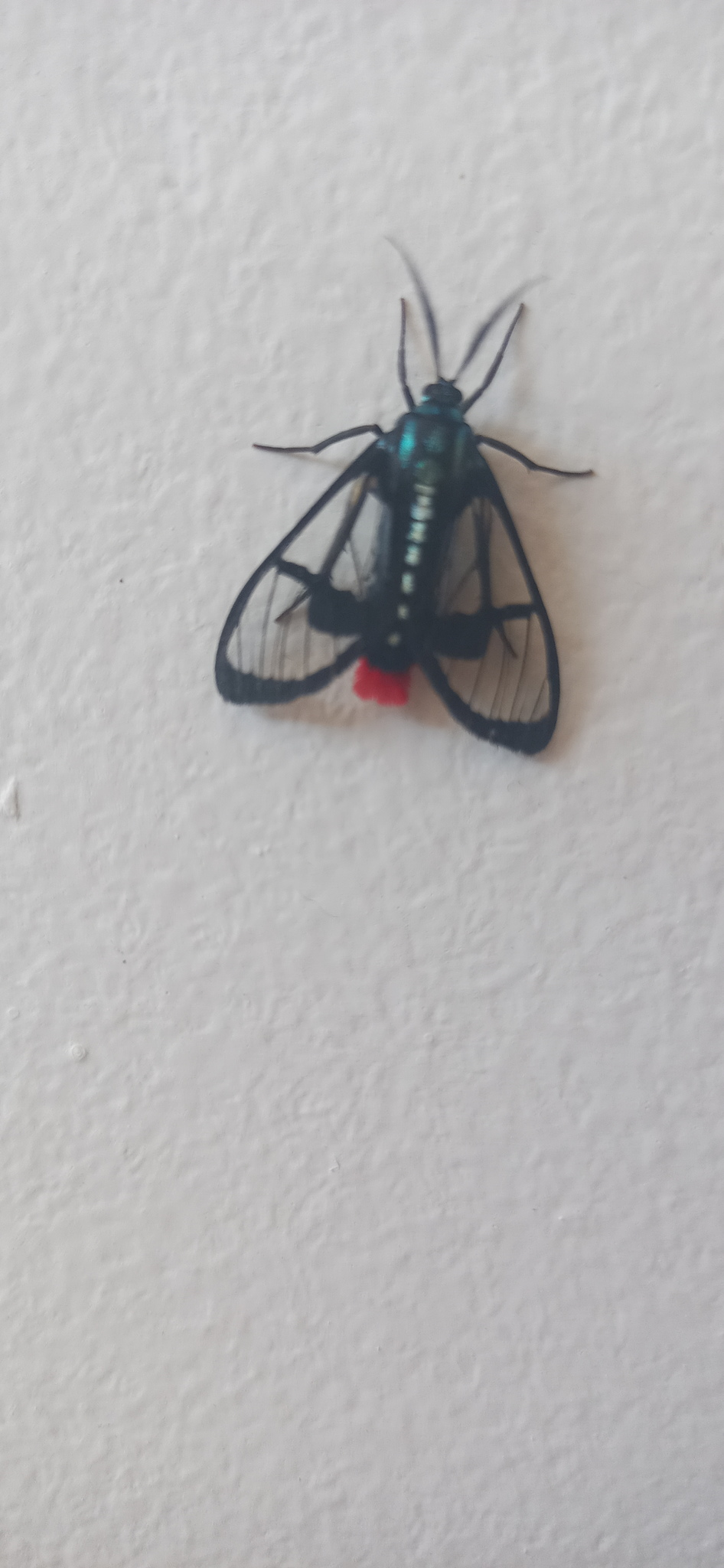

Scientific classification
- Kingdom: Animalia
- Phylum: Arthropoda
- Class: Insecta
- Order: Lepidoptera
- Superfamily: Noctuoidea
- Family: Erebidae
- Subfamily: Arctiinae
- Genus: Clystea
- Species: C. leucaspis

Binomial name
- Clystea leucaspis (Cramer, [1775])

Synonyms
- Sphinx leucaspis Cramer, [1775]; Aethria langleyi Klages, 1906; Aetheria leucaspis Hampson, 1898 (Lapsus); Aethria leucaspis flava Draudt, 1915

= Clystea leucaspis =

Species of moth

Clystea leucaspis is a moth of the subfamily Arctiinae. It was described by Pieter Cramer in 1775. It is found in Venezuela, Bolivia and Brazil.
