= Neocompsa santarensis =

Scientific classification
- Kingdom: Animalia
- Phylum: Arthropoda
- Class: Insecta
- Order: Coleoptera
- Suborder: Polyphaga
- Infraorder: Cucujiformia
- Family: Cerambycidae
- Genus: Neocompsa
- Species: N. santarensis

Binomial name
- Neocompsa santarensis Martins & Galileo, 1998

Species of beetle

Neocompsa santarensis is a species of beetle in the family Cerambycidae. It was described by Martins and Galileo in 1998.
