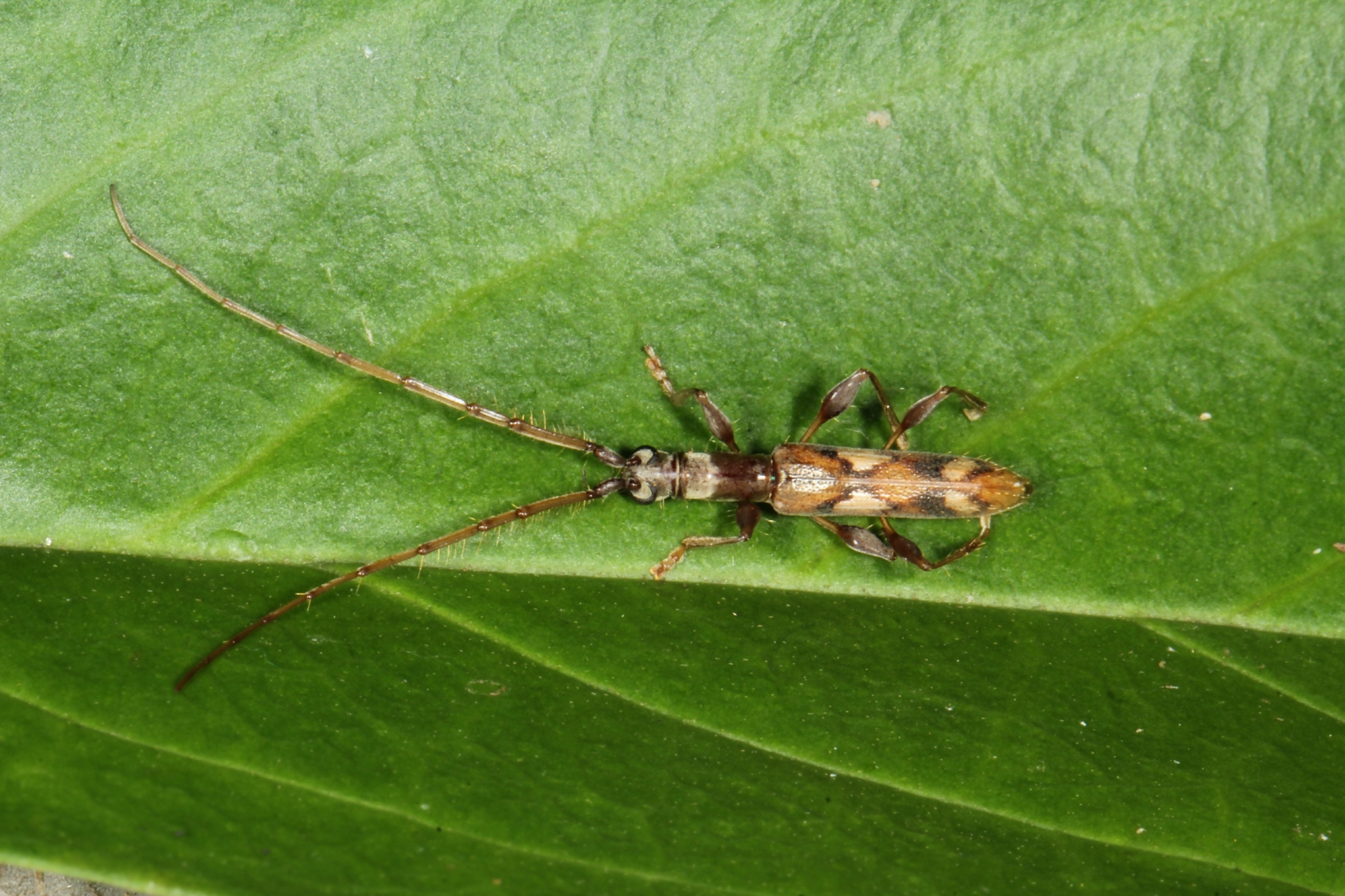

Scientific classification
- Kingdom: Animalia
- Phylum: Arthropoda
- Class: Insecta
- Order: Coleoptera
- Suborder: Polyphaga
- Infraorder: Cucujiformia
- Family: Cerambycidae
- Genus: Neocompsa
- Species: N. textilis

Binomial name
- Neocompsa textilis (Thomson, 1865)

= Neocompsa textilis =

Species of beetle

Neocompsa textilis is a species of beetle in the family Cerambycidae. It was described by Thomson in 1865.
