= Neocompsa ventricosa =

Scientific classification
- Kingdom: Animalia
- Phylum: Arthropoda
- Class: Insecta
- Order: Coleoptera
- Suborder: Polyphaga
- Infraorder: Cucujiformia
- Family: Cerambycidae
- Genus: Neocompsa
- Species: N. ventricosa

Binomial name
- Neocompsa ventricosa (Bates, 1885)

Species of beetle

Neocompsa ventricosa is a species of beetle in the family Cerambycidae. It was described by Bates in 1885.
