= Neocompsa longipilis =

Scientific classification
- Kingdom: Animalia
- Phylum: Arthropoda
- Class: Insecta
- Order: Coleoptera
- Suborder: Polyphaga
- Infraorder: Cucujiformia
- Family: Cerambycidae
- Genus: Neocompsa
- Species: N. longipilis

Binomial name
- Neocompsa longipilis Martins & Galileo, 2002

Species of beetle

Neocompsa longipilis is a species of beetle in the family Cerambycidae. It was described by Martins and Galileo in 2002.
