= Neocompsa bimaculata =

Scientific classification
- Kingdom: Animalia
- Phylum: Arthropoda
- Class: Insecta
- Order: Coleoptera
- Suborder: Polyphaga
- Infraorder: Cucujiformia
- Family: Cerambycidae
- Genus: Neocompsa
- Species: N. bimaculata

Binomial name
- Neocompsa bimaculata Martins & Napp, 1986

Species of beetle

Neocompsa bimaculata is a species of beetle in the family Cerambycidae. It was described by Martins and Napp in 1986.
