= Neocompsa micromacula =

Scientific classification
- Kingdom: Animalia
- Phylum: Arthropoda
- Class: Insecta
- Order: Coleoptera
- Suborder: Polyphaga
- Infraorder: Cucujiformia
- Family: Cerambycidae
- Genus: Neocompsa
- Species: N. micromacula

Binomial name
- Neocompsa micromacula Martins & Galileo, 1999

Species of beetle

Neocompsa micromacula is a species of beetle in the family Cerambycidae. It was described by Martins and Galileo in 1999.
