= Neocompsa pallida =

Scientific classification
- Kingdom: Animalia
- Phylum: Arthropoda
- Class: Insecta
- Order: Coleoptera
- Suborder: Polyphaga
- Infraorder: Cucujiformia
- Family: Cerambycidae
- Genus: Neocompsa
- Species: N. pallida

Binomial name
- Neocompsa pallida Martins & Galileo, 2010

Species of beetle

Neocompsa pallida is a species of beetle in the family Cerambycidae. It was described by Martins and Galileo in 2010.
