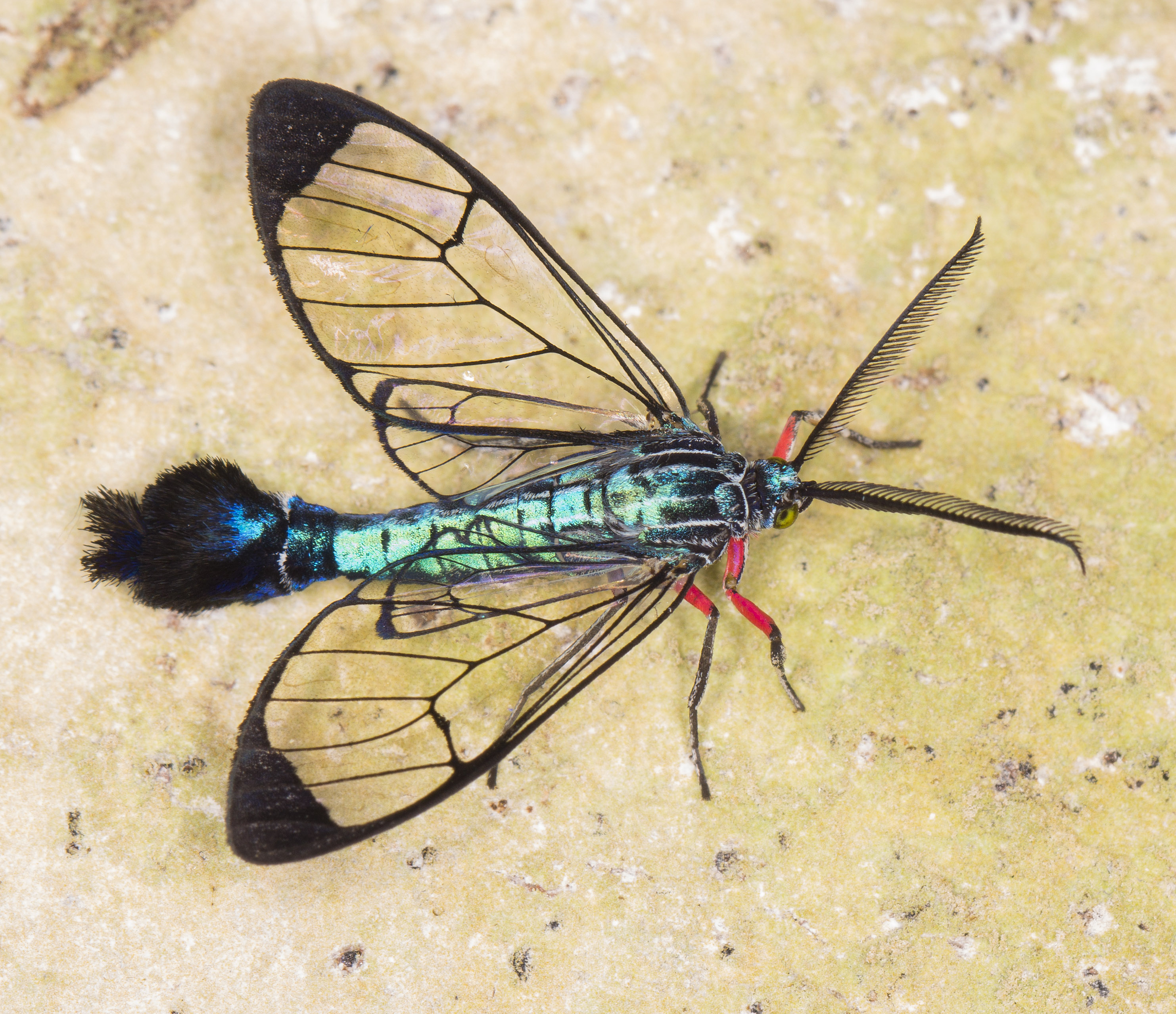

Scientific classification
- Domain: Eukaryota
- Kingdom: Animalia
- Phylum: Arthropoda
- Class: Insecta
- Order: Lepidoptera
- Superfamily: Noctuoidea
- Family: Erebidae
- Subfamily: Arctiinae
- Genus: Clystea
- Species: C. rubipectus

Binomial name
- Clystea rubipectus (Schaus, 1898)

Synonyms
- Aethria rubipectus Schaus, 1898

= Clystea rubipectus =

Species of moth

Clystea rubipectus is a moth of the subfamily Arctiinae. It was described by William Schaus in 1898. It is found on Hispaniola.
