= Clystea daltha =

Scientific classification
- Domain: Eukaryota
- Kingdom: Animalia
- Phylum: Arthropoda
- Class: Insecta
- Order: Lepidoptera
- Superfamily: Noctuoidea
- Family: Erebidae
- Subfamily: Arctiinae
- Genus: Clystea
- Species: C. daltha

Binomial name
- Clystea daltha (H. Druce, 1895)

Synonyms
- Eunomia daltha H. Druce, 1895; Clystea eliza Klages, 1906; Clystea eliza f. tenuistriga Draudt, 1915

Species of moth

Clystea daltha is a moth of the subfamily Arctiinae. It was described by Herbert Druce in 1895. It is found in Pará, Brazil.
