= Neocompsa v-flava =

Scientific classification
- Kingdom: Animalia
- Phylum: Arthropoda
- Class: Insecta
- Order: Coleoptera
- Suborder: Polyphaga
- Infraorder: Cucujiformia
- Family: Cerambycidae
- Genus: Neocompsa
- Species: N. v-flava

Binomial name
- Neocompsa v-flava (Melzer, 1931)

Species of beetle

Neocompsa v-flava is a species of beetle in the family Cerambycidae. It was described by Melzer in 1931.
