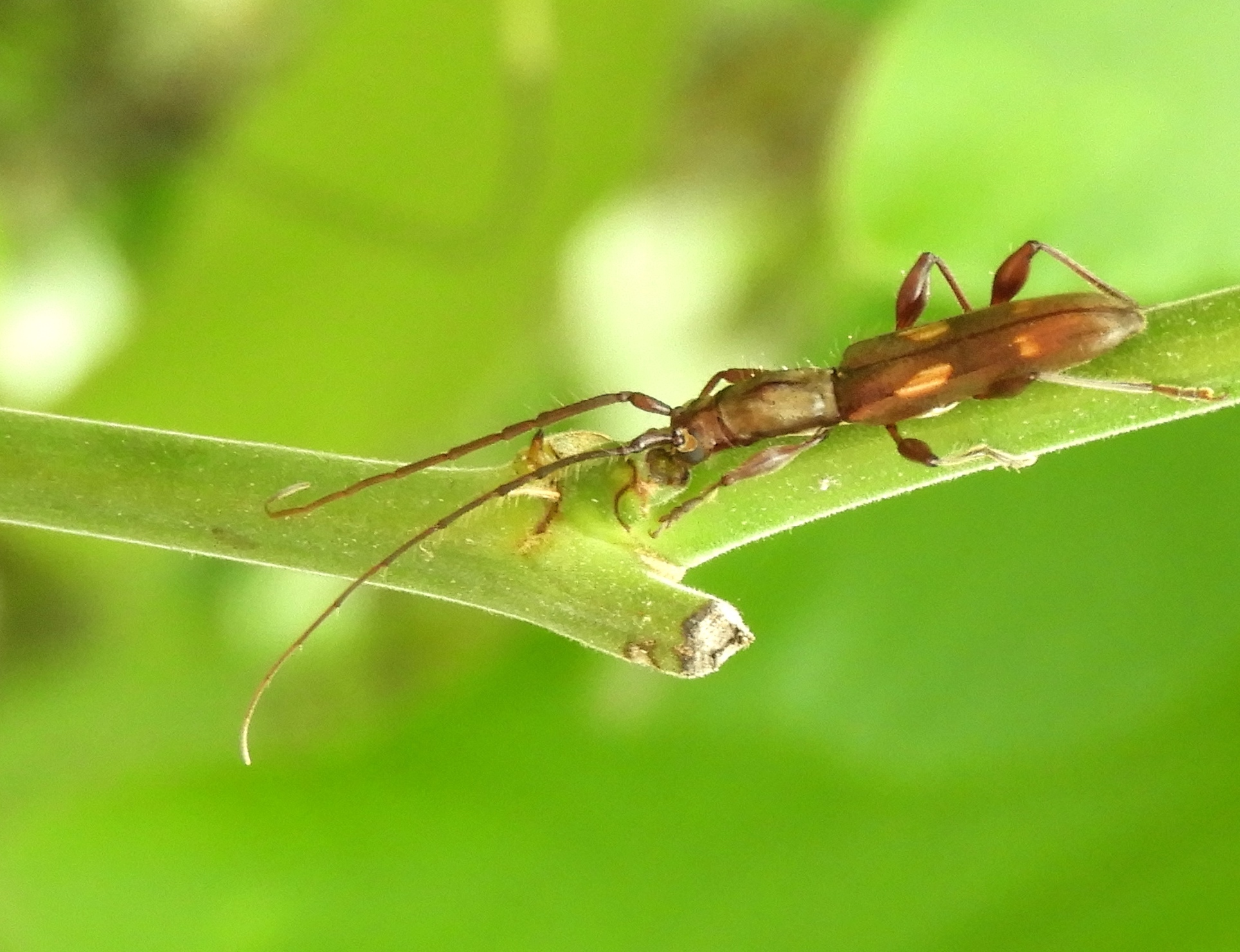
- Neocompsa agnosta

Scientific classification
- Kingdom: Animalia
- Phylum: Arthropoda
- Class: Insecta
- Order: Coleoptera
- Suborder: Polyphaga
- Infraorder: Cucujiformia
- Family: Cerambycidae
- Subfamily: Cerambycinae
- Tribe: Ibidionini
- Genus: Neocompsa; Martins, 1965

= Neocompsa =

Genus of beetles

Neocompsa is a genus of beetles in the family Cerambycidae, containing the following species:

- Neocompsa agnosta Martins, 1970
- Neocompsa alacris (Bates, 1885)
- Neocompsa albopilosa (Martins, 1962)
- Neocompsa aspasia Martins, 1974
- Neocompsa bimaculata Martins & Napp, 1986
- Neocompsa bravo Heffern, Botero & Santos-Silva 2020
- Neocompsa chemsaki Martins, 1970
- Neocompsa chiapensis Martins & Galileo 2014
- Neocompsa clerochroa (Thomson, 1867)
- Neocompsa comula Martins, 1970
- Neocompsa cylindricollis (Fabricius, 1798)
- Neocompsa dysthymia Martins, 1970
- Neocompsa eburioides (Thomson, 1867)
- Neocompsa exclamationis (Thomson, 1860)
- Neocompsa fefeyei Joly, 1991
- Neocompsa flavoquadripunctata Botero & Santos-Silva 2022
- Neocompsa fulgens (Fisher, 1932)
- Neocompsa gaumeri (Bates, 1892)
- Neocompsa giesberti Martins & Napp, 1986
- Neocompsa glaphyra Martins, 1970
- Neocompsa habra Martins, 1970
- Neocompsa intricata Martins, 1970
- Neocompsa leechi Martins, 1970
- Neocompsa lenticula Martins, 1970
- Neocompsa limatula Martins & Napp, 1986
- Neocompsa lineolata (Bates, 1870)
- Neocompsa longipilis Martins & Galileo, 2002
- Neocompsa macroscina Martins, 1970
- Neocompsa macrotricha Martins, 1970
- Neocompsa magnifica Martins, 1971
- Neocompsa mendezi Giesbert, 1998
- Neocompsa mexicana (Thomson, 1865)
- Neocompsa micromacula Martins & Galileo, 1999
- Neocompsa mimosa Martins, 1971
- Neocompsa monnei Bezark & Santos-Silva 2019
- Neocompsa muira Martins & Galileo 2014
- Neocompsa obliqua Bezark & Santos-Silva 2023
- Neocompsa obscura Martins, 2009
- Neocompsa pallida Martins & Galileo, 2010
- Neocompsa pilosa Garcia & Santos-Silva 2022
- Neocompsa ptoma Martins, 1971
- Neocompsa puncticollis (LeConte, 1873)
- Neocompsa pysma Martins, 1970
- Neocompsa quadriplagiata (LeConte, 1873)
- Neocompsa ruatana (Bates, 1892)
- Neocompsa santarensis Martins & Galileo, 1998
- Neocompsa schneppi Wappes & Santos-Silva, 2016
- Neocompsa sericans (Bates, 1885)
- Neocompsa serrana (Martins, 1962)
- Neocompsa sinaloana (Linsley, 1935)
- Neocompsa soniae Garcia & Santos-Silva 2022
- Neocompsa spinosa Martins, 1970
- Neocompsa squalida (Thomson, 1867)
- Neocompsa tenuissima (Bates, 1885)
- Neocompsa textilis (Thomson, 1865)
- Neocompsa thelgema Martins, 1971
- Neocompsa tuberosa Martins, 1970
- Neocompsa tucumana (Martins, 1962)
- Neocompsa turnbowi Giesbert, 1998
- Neocompsa v-flava (Melzer, 1931)
- Neocompsa ventricosa (Bates, 1885)
- Neocompsa veracruzana Martins, 1971
- Neocompsa vogti Martins, 1970
- Neocompsa wappesi Giesbert, 1998
- Neocompsa werneri Martins, 1970
