= Neocompsa ruatana =

Scientific classification
- Kingdom: Animalia
- Phylum: Arthropoda
- Class: Insecta
- Order: Coleoptera
- Suborder: Polyphaga
- Infraorder: Cucujiformia
- Family: Cerambycidae
- Genus: Neocompsa
- Species: N. ruatana

Binomial name
- Neocompsa ruatana (Bates, 1892)

Species of beetle

Neocompsa ruatana is a species of beetle in the family Cerambycidae. It was described by Bates in 1892.
