= Clystea gracilis =

Scientific classification
- Domain: Eukaryota
- Kingdom: Animalia
- Phylum: Arthropoda
- Class: Insecta
- Order: Lepidoptera
- Superfamily: Noctuoidea
- Family: Erebidae
- Subfamily: Arctiinae
- Genus: Clystea
- Species: C. gracilis

Binomial name
- Clystea gracilis (Möschler, 1877)

Synonyms
- Hyela gracilis Möschler, 1878

Species of moth

Clystea gracilis is a moth of the subfamily Arctiinae. It was described by Heinrich Benno Möschler in 1877. It is found in Suriname and Rio de Janeiro, Brazil.
