= Neocompsa sinaloana =

Scientific classification
- Kingdom: Animalia
- Phylum: Arthropoda
- Class: Insecta
- Order: Coleoptera
- Suborder: Polyphaga
- Infraorder: Cucujiformia
- Family: Cerambycidae
- Genus: Neocompsa
- Species: N. sinaloana

Binomial name
- Neocompsa sinaloana (Linsley, 1935)

Species of beetle

Neocompsa sinaloana is a species of beetle in the family Cerambycidae. It was described by Linsley in 1935.
