= Clystea frigida =

Scientific classification
- Kingdom: Animalia
- Phylum: Arthropoda
- Class: Insecta
- Order: Lepidoptera
- Superfamily: Noctuoidea
- Family: Erebidae
- Subfamily: Arctiinae
- Genus: Clystea
- Species: C. frigida

Binomial name
- Clystea frigida (Burmeister, 1878)

Synonyms
- Eurota frigida Burmeister, 1878

Species of moth

Clystea frigida is a moth of the subfamily Arctiinae. It was described by Hermann Burmeister in 1878. It is found in Argentina.
