= Neocompsa wappesi =

Scientific classification
- Kingdom: Animalia
- Phylum: Arthropoda
- Class: Insecta
- Order: Coleoptera
- Suborder: Polyphaga
- Infraorder: Cucujiformia
- Family: Cerambycidae
- Genus: Neocompsa
- Species: N. wappesi

Binomial name
- Neocompsa wappesi Giesbert, 1998

Species of beetle

Neocompsa wappesi is a species of beetle in the family Cerambycidae. It was described by Giesbert in 1998.
