= Clystea tenumarginata =

Scientific classification
- Domain: Eukaryota
- Kingdom: Animalia
- Phylum: Arthropoda
- Class: Insecta
- Order: Lepidoptera
- Superfamily: Noctuoidea
- Family: Erebidae
- Subfamily: Arctiinae
- Genus: Clystea
- Species: C. tenumarginata

Binomial name
- Clystea tenumarginata (Kaye, 1919)

Synonyms
- Aethria tenumarginata Kaye, 1919

Species of moth

Clystea tenumarginata is a moth of the subfamily Arctiinae. It was described by William James Kaye in 1919. It is found in Guyana.
