= Clystea lepida =

Scientific classification
- Domain: Eukaryota
- Kingdom: Animalia
- Phylum: Arthropoda
- Class: Insecta
- Order: Lepidoptera
- Superfamily: Noctuoidea
- Family: Erebidae
- Subfamily: Arctiinae
- Genus: Clystea
- Species: C. lepida

Binomial name
- Clystea lepida (Draudt, 1915)

Synonyms
- Aethria lepida Draudt, 1915

Species of moth

Clystea lepida is a moth of the subfamily Arctiinae. It was described by Max Wilhelm Karl Draudt in 1915. It is found in French Guiana.
