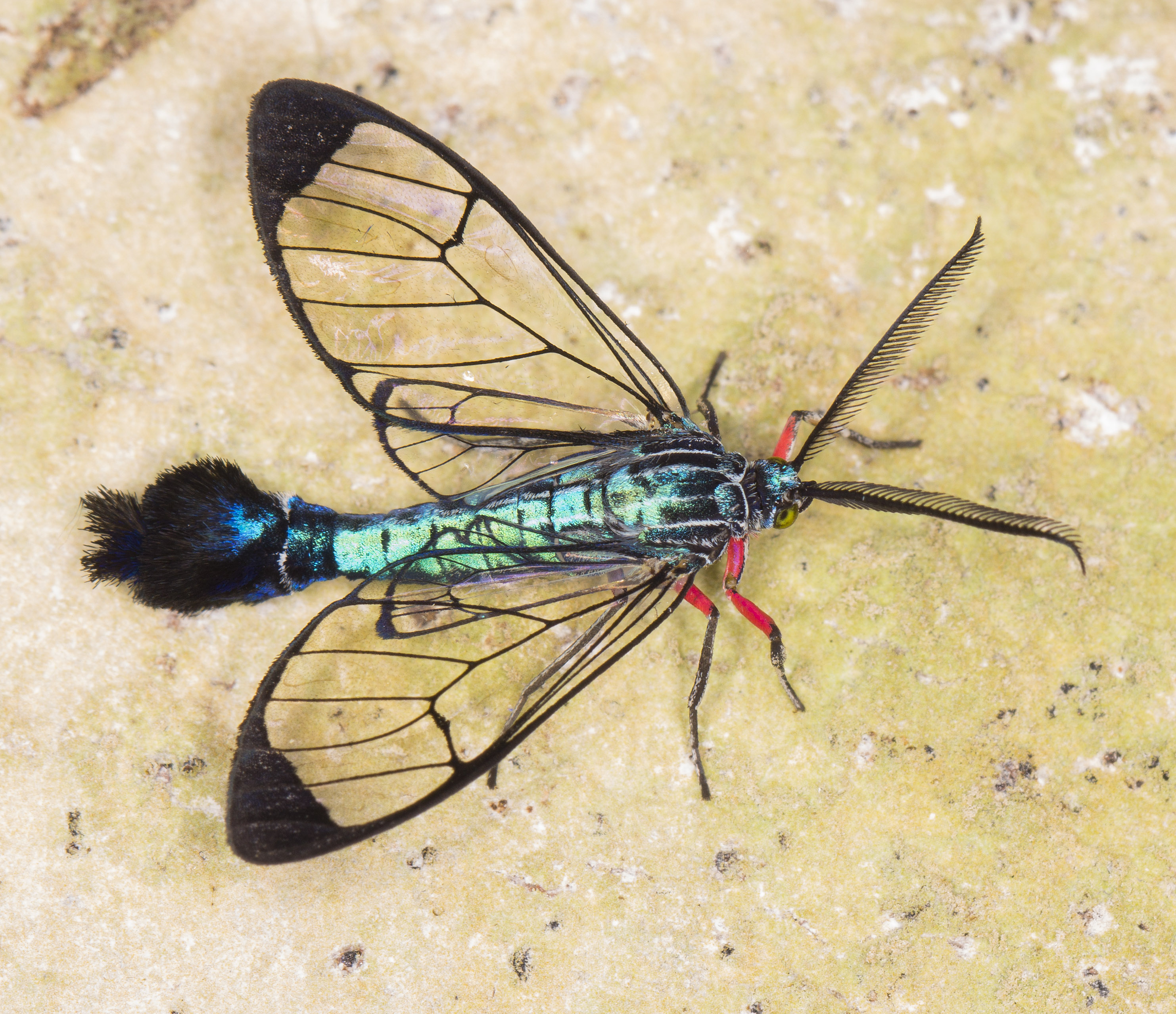
- Clystea rubipectus

Scientific classification
- Domain: Eukaryota
- Kingdom: Animalia
- Phylum: Arthropoda
- Class: Insecta
- Order: Lepidoptera
- Superfamily: Noctuoidea
- Family: Erebidae
- Subfamily: Arctiinae
- Genus: Clystea; Watson, 1980

Synonyms
- Scytale Felder, 1874

= Clystea =

Genus of moths

Clystea is a genus of moths in the subfamily Arctiinae. The genus was described by Watson in 1980.

== Species ==
- Clystea andromacha Fabricius, 1775
- Clystea aner Hampson, 1905
- Clystea carnicauda Butler, 1876
- Clystea daltha Druce, 1895
- Clystea dorsilineata Hampson, 1898
- Clystea eburneifera Felder, 1869
- Clystea frigida Burmeister, 1878
- Clystea fulvicauda Butler, 1896
- Clystea gracilis Möschler, 1877
- Clystea jacksoni Kaye, 1925
- Clystea lepida Draudt, 1915
- Clystea leucaspis Cramer, 1775
- Clystea ocina Druce, 1883
- Clystea paulista Draudt, 1915
- Clystea platyzona Felder, 1869
- Clystea rubipectus Schaus, 1898
- Clystea sanctula Dognin, 1911
- Clystea sarcosoma Butler, 1876
- Clystea serrana Schaus, 1928
- Clystea stipata Walker, 1854
- Clystea tenumarginata Kaye, 1919
