= Neocompsa fefeyei =

Scientific classification
- Kingdom: Animalia
- Phylum: Arthropoda
- Class: Insecta
- Order: Coleoptera
- Suborder: Polyphaga
- Infraorder: Cucujiformia
- Family: Cerambycidae
- Genus: Neocompsa
- Species: N. fefeyei

Binomial name
- Neocompsa fefeyei Joly, 1991

Species of beetle

Neocompsa fefeyei is a species of beetle in the family Cerambycidae. It was described by Joly in 1991.
