= Potiatuca =

Scientific classification
- Kingdom: Animalia
- Phylum: Arthropoda
- Class: Insecta
- Order: Coleoptera
- Suborder: Polyphaga
- Infraorder: Cucujiformia
- Family: Cerambycidae
- Tribe: Apomecynini
- Genus: Potiatuca

Genus of beetles

Potiatuca is a genus of beetles in the family Cerambycidae, containing the following species:

- Potiatuca carioca Monne & Monne, 2009
- Potiatuca ingridae Galileo & Martins, 2006
- Potiatuca serrana Monne & Monne, 2009
