= Clystea jacksoni =

Scientific classification
- Domain: Eukaryota
- Kingdom: Animalia
- Phylum: Arthropoda
- Class: Insecta
- Order: Lepidoptera
- Superfamily: Noctuoidea
- Family: Erebidae
- Subfamily: Arctiinae
- Genus: Clystea
- Species: C. jacksoni

Binomial name
- Clystea jacksoni (Kaye, 1925)

Synonyms
- Aethria jacksoni Kaye, 1925

Species of moth

Clystea jacksoni is a moth of the subfamily Arctiinae. It was described by William James Kaye in 1925. It is found in Trinidad.
