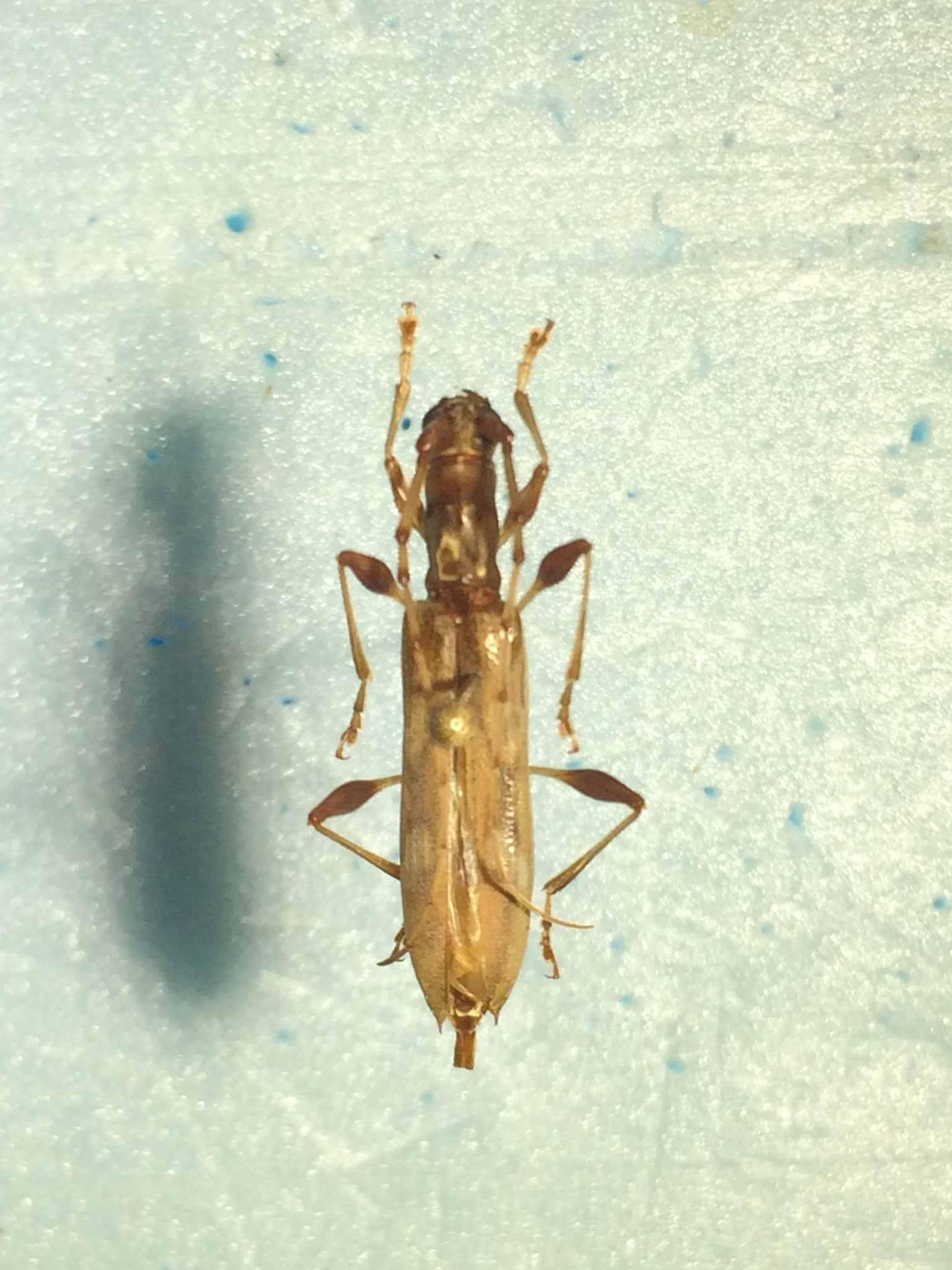

Scientific classification
- Kingdom: Animalia
- Phylum: Arthropoda
- Class: Insecta
- Order: Coleoptera
- Suborder: Polyphaga
- Infraorder: Cucujiformia
- Family: Cerambycidae
- Genus: Neocompsa
- Species: N. sericans

Binomial name
- Neocompsa sericans (Bates, 1885)

= Neocompsa sericans =

Species of beetle

Neocompsa sericans is a species of beetle in the family Cerambycidae. It was described by Bates in 1885.
