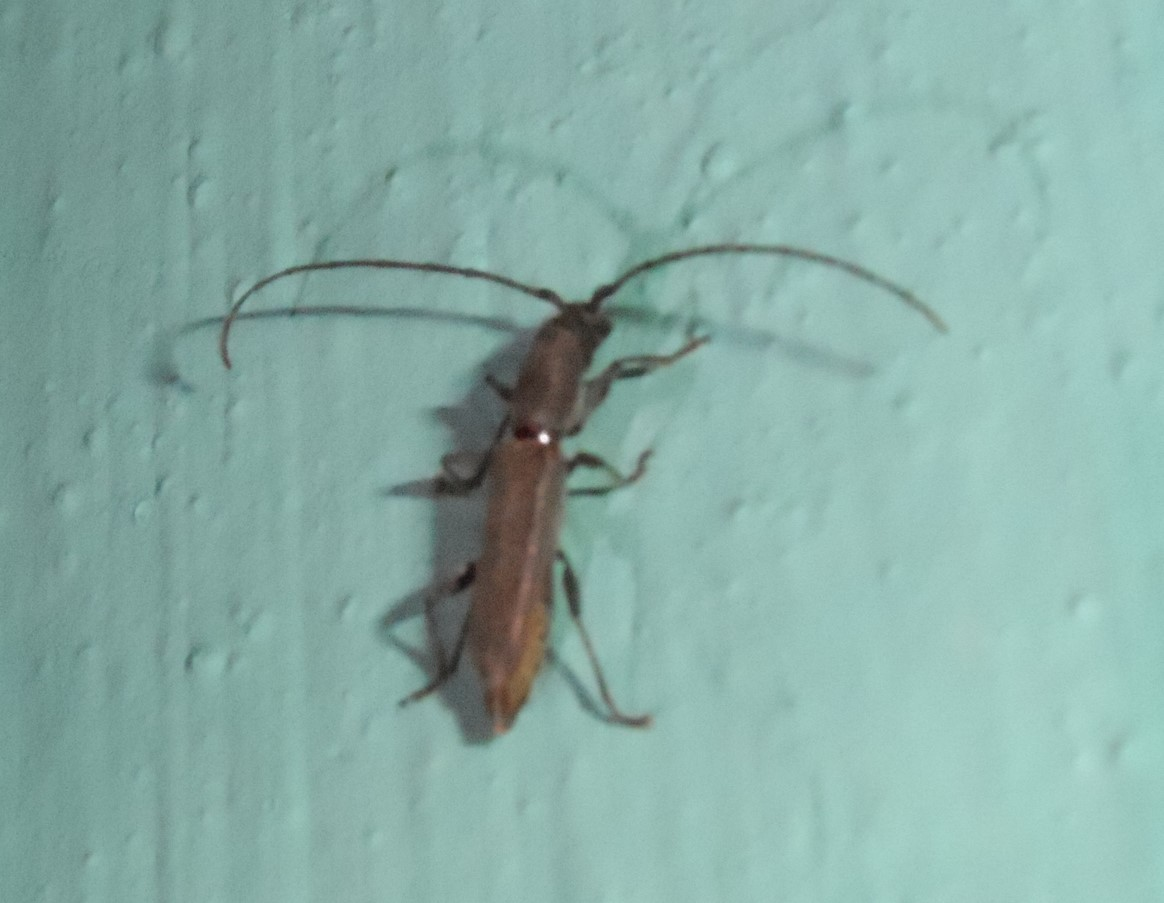

Scientific classification
- Kingdom: Animalia
- Phylum: Arthropoda
- Clade: Pancrustacea
- Class: Insecta
- Order: Coleoptera
- Suborder: Polyphaga
- Infraorder: Cucujiformia
- Family: Cerambycidae
- Genus: Neocompsa
- Species: N. puncticollis

Binomial name
- Neocompsa puncticollis (LeConte, 1873)

Synonyms
- Compsa puncticollis LeConte, 1873; Ibidion asperulum Bates, 1885

= Neocompsa puncticollis =

Species of beetle

Neocompsa puncticollis is a species of beetle in the family Cerambycidae. It was described by John Lawrence LeConte in 1873. It occurs in the United States (California to Texas), Mexico, Guatemala, and Nicaragua.

Neocompsa puncticollis measure 7–14 mm (0.28–0.55 in).

== Subspecies ==
There are three subspecies:

- Neocompsa puncticollis puncticollis (LeConte, 1873)
- Neocompsa puncticollis asperula (Bates, 1885)
- Neocompsa puncticollis orientalis Martins & Chemsak, 1966
