= Clystea aner =

Scientific classification
- Kingdom: Animalia
- Phylum: Arthropoda
- Class: Insecta
- Order: Lepidoptera
- Superfamily: Noctuoidea
- Family: Erebidae
- Subfamily: Arctiinae
- Genus: Clystea
- Species: C. aner

Binomial name
- Clystea aner Hampson, 1905

Synonyms
- Clystea aner f. auriflua Draudt, 1915; Clystea carnicauda Hampson, 1898

Species of moth

Clystea aner is a moth of the subfamily Arctiinae. It was described by George Hampson in 1905. It is found in Venezuela.
