= Clystea eburneifera =

Scientific classification
- Domain: Eukaryota
- Kingdom: Animalia
- Phylum: Arthropoda
- Class: Insecta
- Order: Lepidoptera
- Superfamily: Noctuoidea
- Family: Erebidae
- Subfamily: Arctiinae
- Genus: Clystea
- Species: C. eburneifera

Binomial name
- Clystea eburneifera (Felder, 1874)

Synonyms
- Glaucopis eburneifera Felder, 1874

Species of moth

Clystea eburneifera is a moth of the subfamily Arctiinae. It was described by Felder in 1869. It is found in the Amazon region.
