= Clystea serrana =

Scientific classification
- Domain: Eukaryota
- Kingdom: Animalia
- Phylum: Arthropoda
- Class: Insecta
- Order: Lepidoptera
- Superfamily: Noctuoidea
- Family: Erebidae
- Subfamily: Arctiinae
- Genus: Clystea
- Species: C. serrana

Binomial name
- Clystea serrana (Schaus, 1928)

Synonyms
- Aethriopsis serrana Schaus, 1928

Species of moth

Clystea serrana is a moth of the subfamily Arctiinae. It was described by Schaus in 1928. It is found in Brazil.
