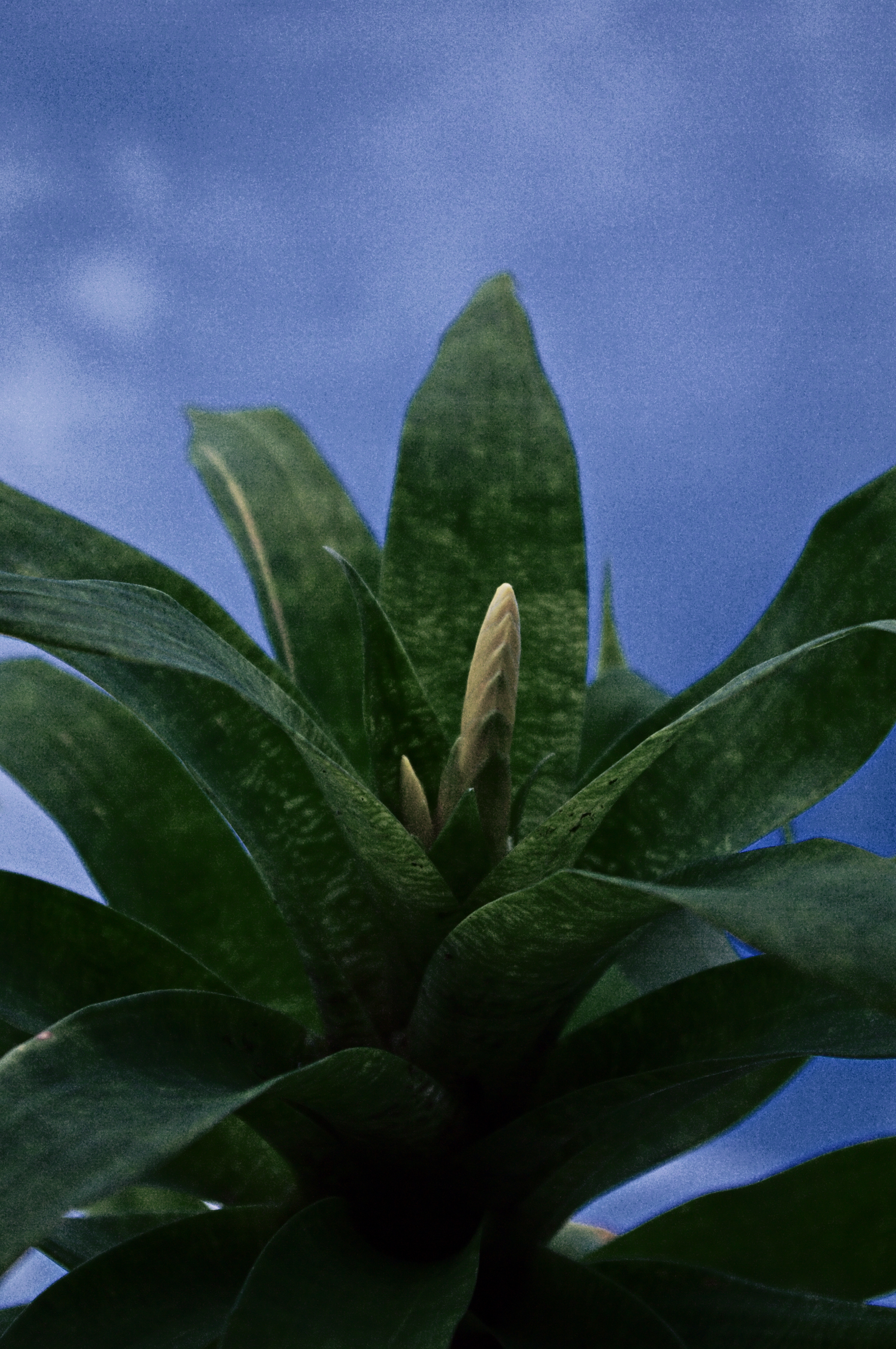

Scientific classification
- Kingdom: Plantae
- Clade: Tracheophytes
- Clade: Angiosperms
- Clade: Monocots
- Clade: Commelinids
- Order: Poales
- Family: Bromeliaceae
- Genus: Vriesea
- Species: V. ospinae

Binomial name
- Vriesea ospinae H.Luther

= Vriesea ospinae =

Species of flowering plant

Vriesea ospinae is a plant species in the genus Vriesea. It is endemic to Colombia. Two varieties are recognized:

1. Vriesea ospinae var. gruberi H.Luther
2. Vriesea ospinae var. ospinae

== Cultivars ==
- Vriesea 'Espirito Santo'
