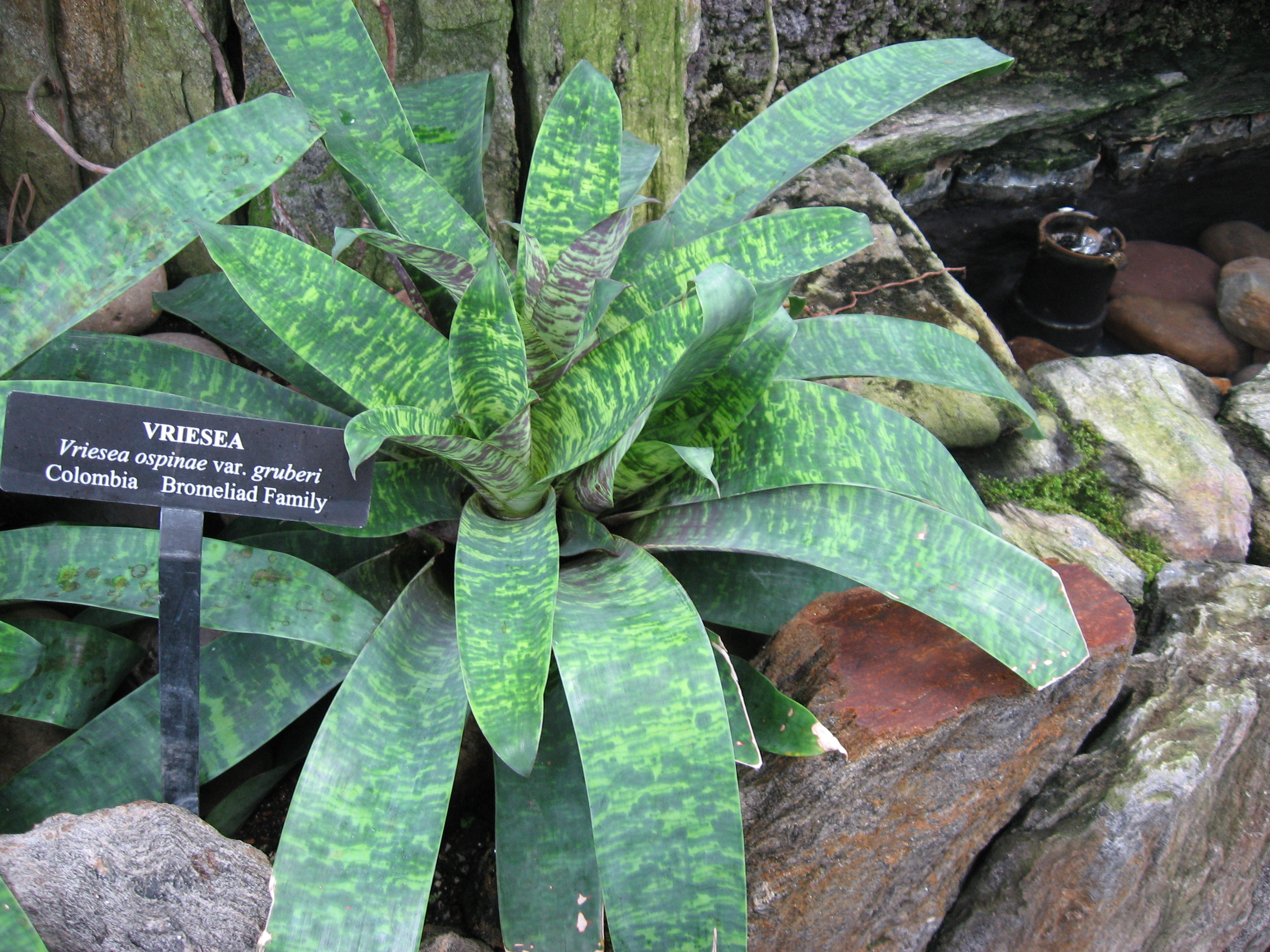

Scientific classification
- Kingdom: Plantae
- Clade: Tracheophytes
- Clade: Angiosperms
- Clade: Monocots
- Clade: Commelinids
- Order: Poales
- Family: Bromeliaceae
- Genus: Vriesea
- Species: V. ospinae
- Variety: V. o. var. gruberi

Trinomial name
- Vriesea ospinae var. gruberi H.Luther

= Vriesea ospinae var. gruberi =

Variety of flowering plant

Vriesea ospinae var. gruberi is a variety of flowering plant in the family Bromeliaceae.
