= Vriesea schultesiana =

Scientific classification
- Kingdom: Plantae
- Clade: Tracheophytes
- Clade: Angiosperms
- Clade: Monocots
- Clade: Commelinids
- Order: Poales
- Family: Bromeliaceae
- Genus: Vriesea
- Species: V. schultesiana

Binomial name
- Vriesea schultesiana L.B.Sm.

Species of epiphyte

Vriesea schultesiana is a plant species of the genus Vriesea. This species is endemic to Colombia. It is rare, listed as "near threatened."

This species growth patterns have been open to conjecture as environmentally localised deformations of the more common Vriesea duvaliana as opposed to a distinct species. Found in subtropical or tropical moist montane forests and subtropical or tropical dry shrubland, the study of this species has proven difficult.

Cultivation has proven successful in Bolivia, Mexico and in Australia and Yemen in substantiating the species as a genetically unique species. Typified by minimal surface growth while proliferating a subsurface network of nutrient deprived grounding support. In periods of dry arid heat the plants proliferation of surface growth is extensive and resembling that of its relative Vriesea duvaliana. Capable of growing between 5-20 times the size of the subsurface network in 10–15 days before plateauing to a stable condition.
