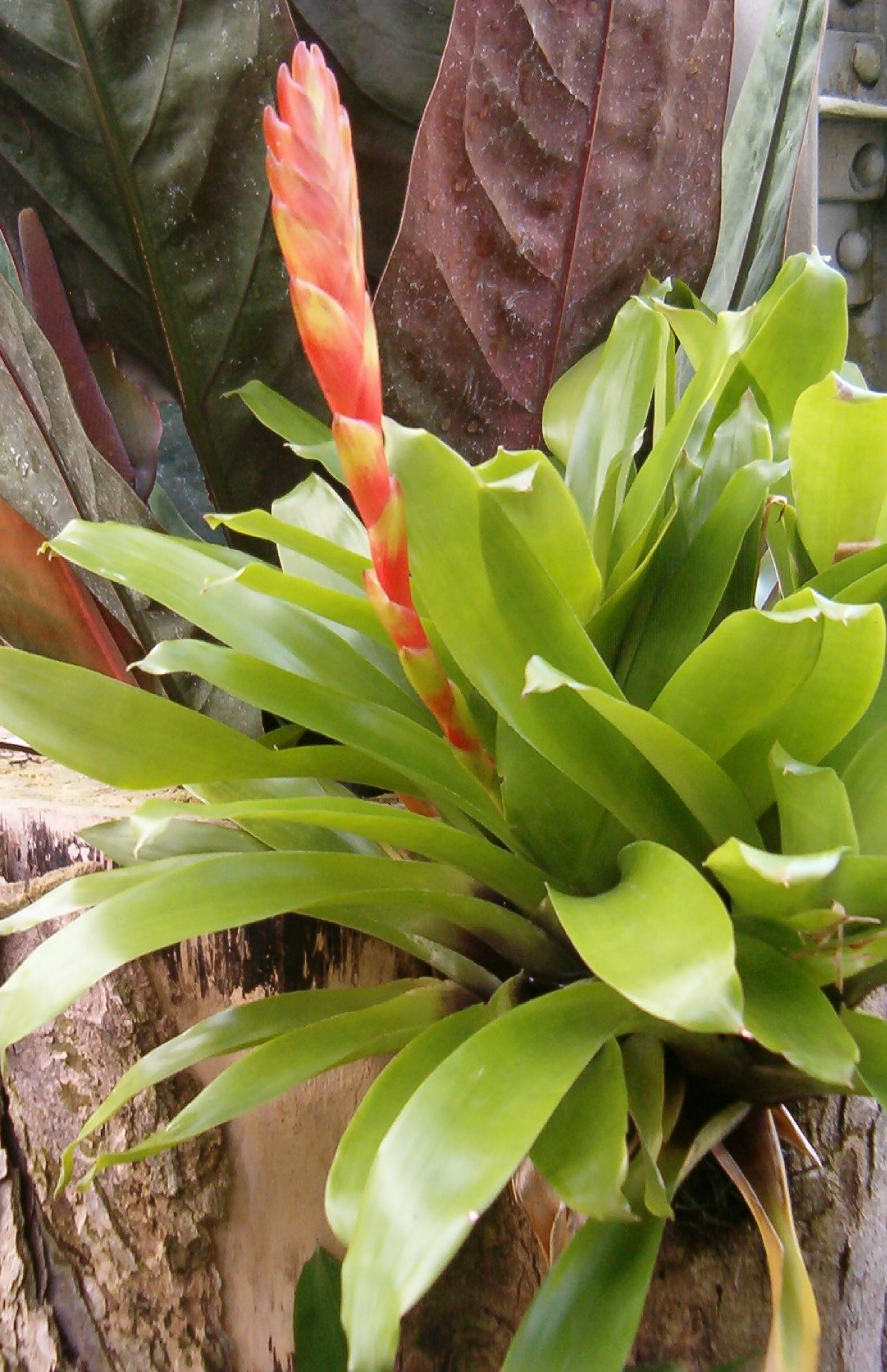

Scientific classification
- Kingdom: Plantae
- Clade: Tracheophytes
- Clade: Angiosperms
- Clade: Monocots
- Clade: Commelinids
- Order: Poales
- Family: Bromeliaceae
- Genus: Vriesea
- Species: V. duvaliana

Binomial name
- Vriesea duvaliana E.Morren

Synonyms
- Vriesea psittacina var. duvaliana (E.Morren) André; Tillandsia duvaliana (E.Morren) Baker

= Vriesea duvaliana =

Species of epiphyte

Vriesea duvaliana is a plant species in the genus Vriesea. It is an epiphyte endemic to the State of Bahia in eastern Brazil, but cultivated in other regions as an ornamental. It (or its cultivar(s)) is a recipient of the Royal Horticultural Society's Award of Garden Merit.

== Cultivars ==
- Vriesea 'Duvaliana Major'
- Vriesea 'Duvalii'
- Vriesea 'Elegans'
- Vriesea 'Fulgida'
- Vriesea 'Minima'
- Vriesea 'Obliqua'
- Vriesea 'Rostrum Aquilae'
- Vriesea 'Splendida'
- Vriesea 'Versaillensis'
