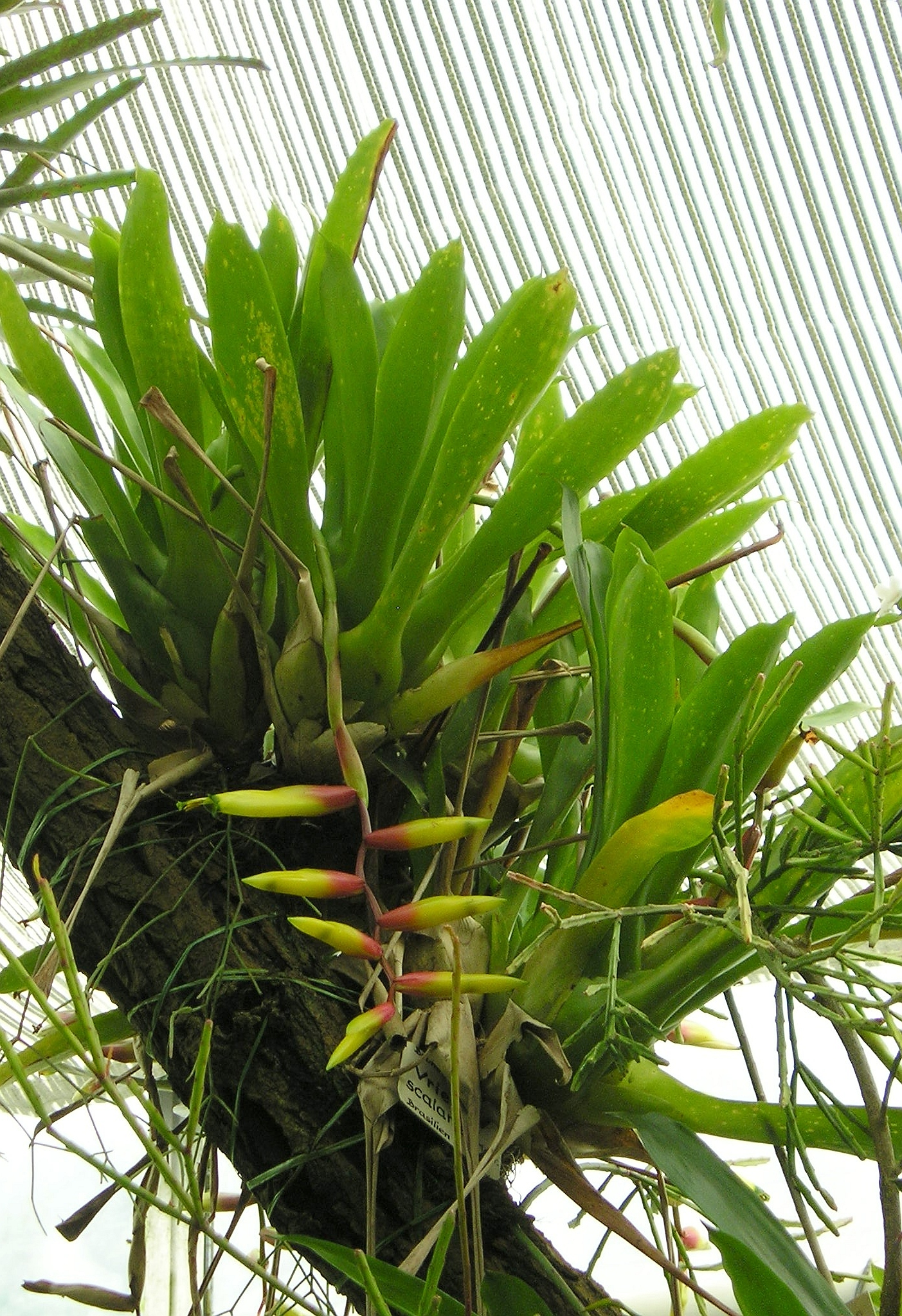

Scientific classification
- Kingdom: Plantae
- Clade: Tracheophytes
- Clade: Angiosperms
- Clade: Monocots
- Clade: Commelinids
- Order: Poales
- Family: Bromeliaceae
- Genus: Vriesea
- Species: V. scalaris

Binomial name
- Vriesea scalaris E.Morren

= Vriesea scalaris =

Species of flowering plant

Vriesea scalaris is a plant species in the genus Vriesea. This species is native to Brazil and Venezuela.

== Cultivars ==
- Vriesea 'April's Fire'
- Vriesea 'Retroflexa'
- Vriesea 'Weyringeriana'
