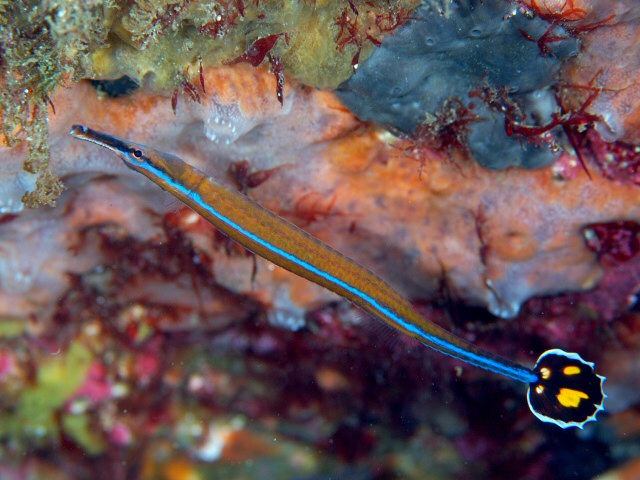
- Doryrhamphus japonicus
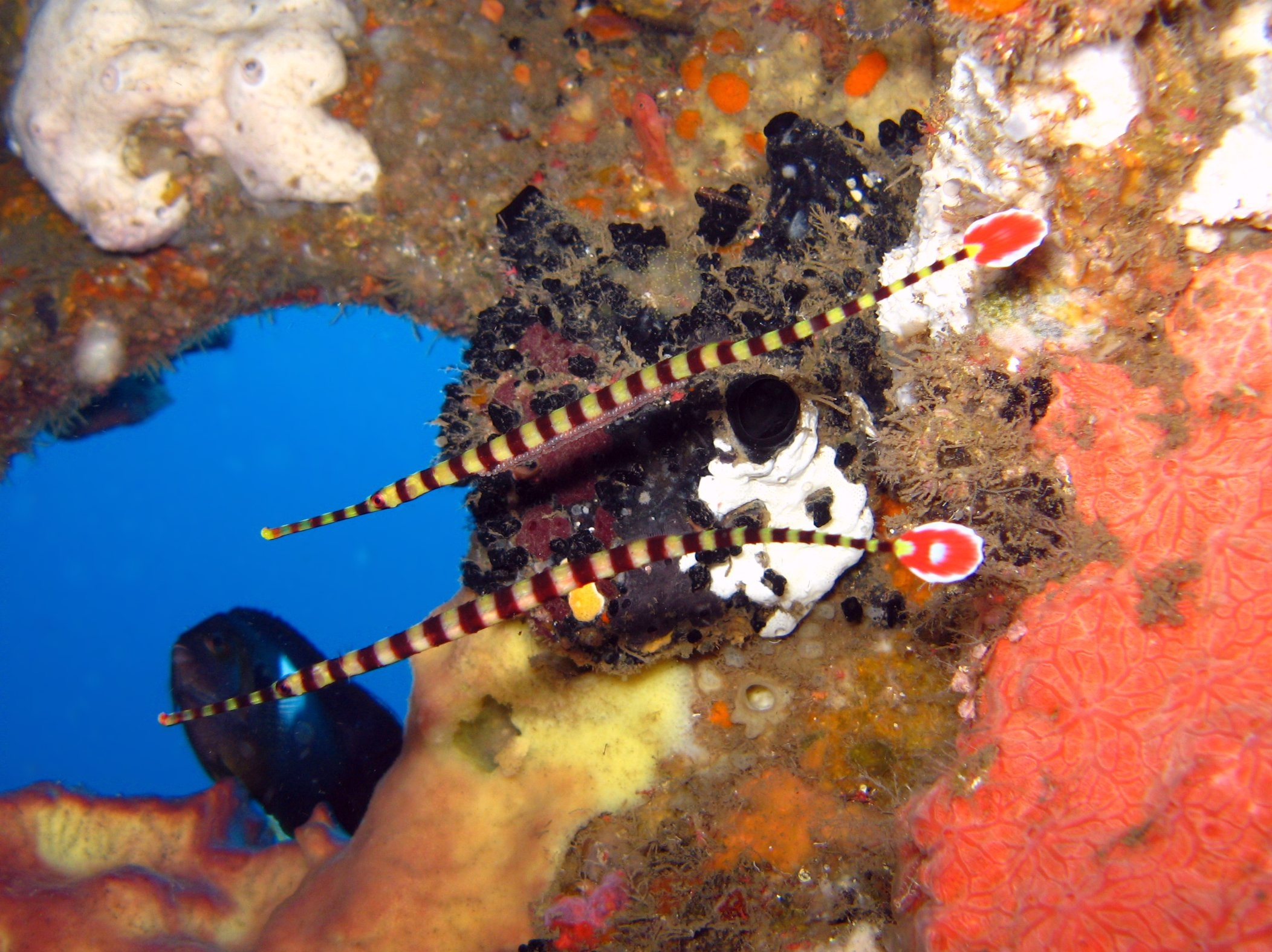
- Dunckerocampus dactyliophorus

Scientific classification
- Domain: Eukaryota
- Kingdom: Animalia
- Phylum: Chordata
- Class: Actinopterygii
- Order: Syngnathiformes
- Family: Syngnathidae
- Subfamily: Syngnathinae

Genera
- Doryrhamphus; Dunckerocampus

= Flagtail pipefish =

Subfamily of fishes

Doryrhamphus and Dunckerocampus, popularly known as flagtail pipefish, are two genera of fishes in the family Syngnathidae. They are found in warm, relatively shallow waters of the Indo-Pacific, with a single species, D. paulus, in the eastern Pacific. Most of these pipefishes are very colourful, and are fairly popular in the marine aquarium hobby despite requiring special care and not being recommended for beginners.

Their habit of flashing the distinctly patterned tails during courtship and other displays have earned them their English common name. Adults are highly territorial and usually live in pairs. They feed on tiny crustaceans and other small animals, and most species from the genus Doryrhamphus will sometimes act as cleaners.

== Description ==
Doryrhamphus have a maximum length of 14 centimetres (5.5 in) or less, with D. janssi being the only species that surpasses 8.5 centimetres (3.3 in). Most species have a horizontal blue line along their body, and all have a whitish-edged tail that is marked contrastingly with black, red or yellow.

Dunckerocampus are more elongated and have a maximum length between 10 and 20 centimetres (3.9 and 7.9 in), with D. chapmani being the only species with a maximum length below 15 centimetres (5.9 in). Their tail is red with a whitish edge, and in some species there is a white or yellow spot in the center. All except D. baldwini (and a similar, but possibly undescribed species from the eastern Indian Ocean) have vertical red/brown and yellow/white stripes on their body.

== Taxonomy ==
Considerable taxonomic confusion exists in these genera, both because a number of scientifically undescribed species remain and some of the already described species are variable.

The first to recognise the species now placed in Dunckerocampus as worthy of a separate genus was the German ichthyologist George Duncker, and for this reason he coined Acanthognathus in 1912. However, unbeknown to him that name was preoccupied by a genus of ants. The replacement name Dunckerocampus honours Duncker.

Following a review in 1985, Dunckerocampus was generally considered a subgenus of Doryrhamphus, but in 1998 it was recommended that Dunckerocampus again should be a genus, and in addition to the species formerly placed in it, it should include the newly described D. boylei. When described in 2004, D. naia was also placed in this genus. Recent authorities generally recognise Doryrhamphus and Dunckerocampus as separate genera.

=== Species ===
Species and genera follow most recent reviews of this group.

- Genus Doryrhamphus:
  - Doryrhamphus aurolineatus Randall & Earle, 1994
  - Narrowstripe pipefish, Doryrhamphus bicarinatus Dawson, 1981
  - Bluestripe pipefish, Doryrhamphus excisus Kaup, 1856
  - Janss' pipefish, Doryrhamphus janssi (Herald & Randall, 1972)
  - Honshu pipefish, Doryrhamphus japonicus Araga & Yoshino, 1975
  - Masthead Island pipefish, Doryrhamphus malus (Whitley, 1954) – treated as a species by some authorities, and a subspecies of D. negrosensis by others.
  - Barhead pipefish, Doryrhamphus melanopleura (Bleeker 1858) – treated as a species by some authorities, and included in D. excisus by others.
  - Negros pipefish, Doryrhamphus negrosensis Herre, 1934
  - Doryrhamphus paulus Fritzsche, 1980 – treated as a species by some authorities, and a subspecies of D. excisus by others.
- Genus Dunckerocampus:
  - Redstripe pipefish, Dunckerocampus baldwini (Herald & Randall, 1972)
  - Broad-banded Pipefish, Dunckerocampus boylei Kuiter, 1998
  - Glowtail pipefish, Dunckerocampus chapmani Herald, 1953
  - Ringed pipefish, Dunckerocampus dactyliophorus (Bleeker, 1853)
  - Many-banded pipefish, Dunckerocampus multiannulatus (Regan, 1903)
  - Dunckerocampus naia Allen & Kuiter, 2004
  - Yellowbanded pipefish, Dunckerocampus pessuliferus Fowler, 1938
