= A. laevigatus =

A. laevigatus may refer to:

- Abacetus laevigatus, a ground beetle
- Acanthognathus laevigatus, an ant found in Colombia
- Acinopus laevigatus, a ground beetle
- Acteon laevigatus, a prehistoric sea snail
- Agnostus laevigatus, a synonym of Lejopyge laevigata, a prehistoric trilobite
- Aistagnostus laevigatus, a prehistoric trilobite
- Alphitobius laevigatus, the black fungus beetle, a darkling beetle found in Europe and North America
- Aster laevigatus, a synonym of Symphyotrichum novi-belgii, New York aster, a plant native to North America
