= Honshu =

Largest island of Japan

Native name: 本州
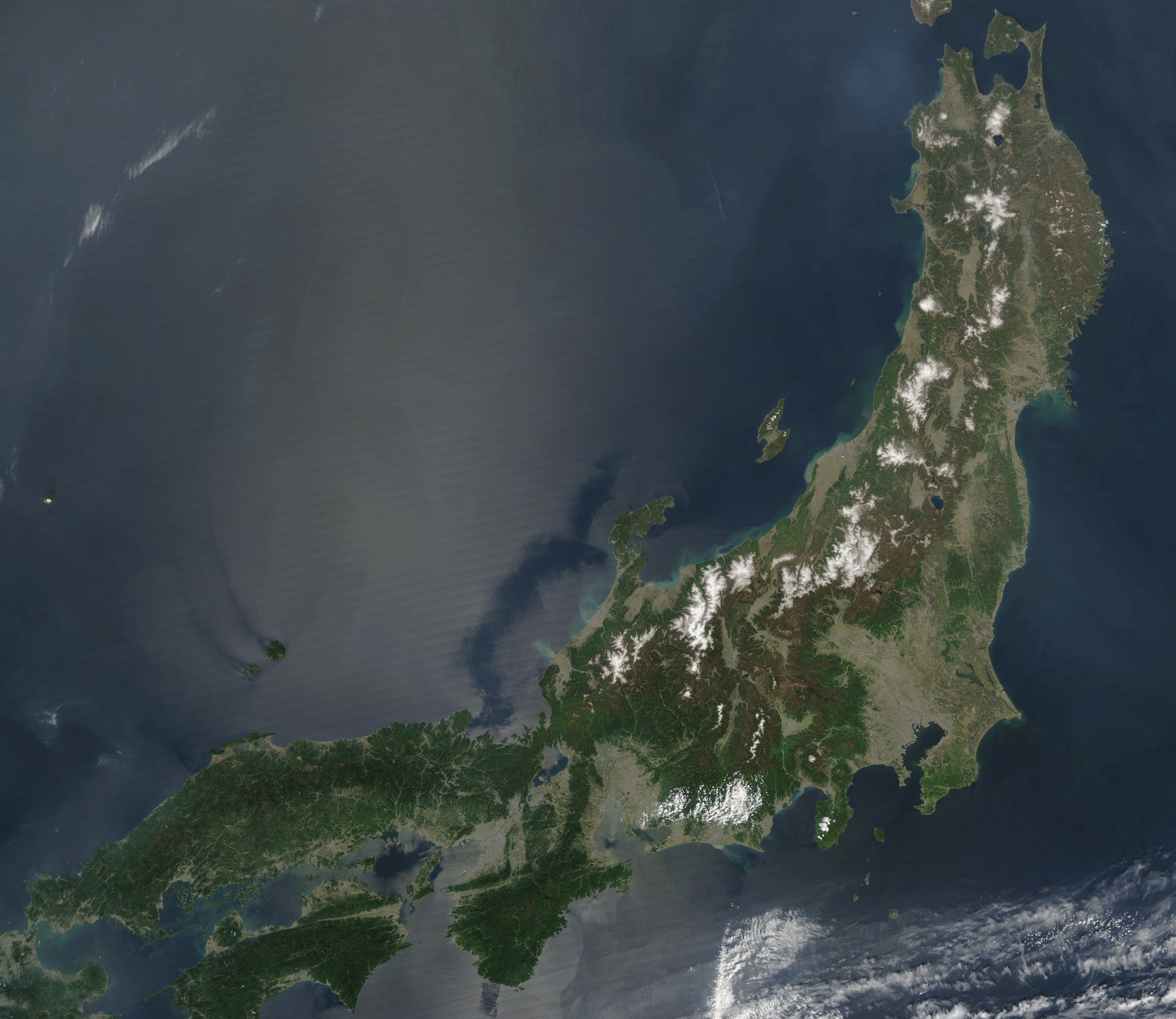
- A May 2003 satellite image of Honshu

Geography
- Location: Sea of Japan (North and West); Pacific Ocean (South and East)
- Coordinates: 36°N 138°E
- Archipelago: Japanese archipelago
- Area: 227,960 km^{2} (88,020 sq mi)
- Area rank: 7th
- Length: 1,300 km (810 mi)
- Width: 50–230 km (31–143 mi)
- Coastline: 10,084 km (6265.9 mi)
- Highest elevation: 3,776 m (12388 ft)
- Highest point: Mount Fuji

Administration
- Japan
- Prefectures: List of prefectures: Aichi; Akita; Aomori; Chiba; Fukui; Fukushima; Gifu; Gunma; Hiroshima; Hyōgo; Ibaraki; Ishikawa; Iwate; Kanagawa; Kyoto; Mie; Miyagi; Nagano; Nara; Niigata; Okayama; Osaka; Saitama; Shiga; Shimane; Shizuoka; Tochigi; Tokyo; Tottori; Toyama; Wakayama; Yamagata; Yamaguchi; Yamanashi
- Largest settlement: Tokyo (pop. 14,246,219)

Demographics
- Population: 102,572,815 (2020)
- Pop. density: 442/km^{2} (1145/sq mi)
- Ethnic groups: Japanese

Additional information
- Time zone: Japan Standard Time (UTC+9)

Honshu (Japanese: 本州, Hepburn: Honshū; pronounced [hó̞ɰ̃̀.ɕɨ̀ɨ̀]; lit. 'main province'), historically known as Akitsushima (秋津島; lit. 'dragonfly island') or Hondo (本土; lit. 'mainland'), is the largest of Japan's four main islands. It lies between the Pacific Ocean (east) and the Sea of Japan (west). It is the seventh-largest island in the world, and the second-most populous after the Indonesian island of Java.

Honshu had a population of 100.7 million as of 2025, constituting 81.9% of the entire population of Japan, and mostly concentrated in the coastal areas and plains. Approximately 30% of the total population resides in the Greater Tokyo Area on the Kantō Plain. As the historical center of Japanese cultural and political power, the island includes several past Japanese capitals, including Kyoto, Nara, and Kamakura. Much of the island's southern shore forms part of the Taiheiyō Belt, a megalopolis that spans several of the Japanese islands. Honshu also contains Japan's highest mountain, Mount Fuji, and its largest lake, Lake Biwa.

Most of Japan's industry is located in a belt running along Honshu's southern coast, from Tokyo to Nagoya, Kyoto, Osaka, Kobe, and Hiroshima. The island is linked to the other three major Japanese islands by a number of bridges and tunnels. The island primarily shares two climates, with Northern Honshu having four seasons with largely varying temperatures while the south experiences long, hot summers and cool to mild winters.

== Etymology ==
The name of the island, Honshū (本州), stems from Middle Chinese. It directly translates to "main province" or "homeland" in English.

== History ==
=== Early history ===
Humans first arrived in Honshu at least approximately 37,000 years ago. The first humans to arrive in Honshu were Stone Age hunter-gatherers from Northeast Asia, likely following the migration of ice age megafauna. Surviving artifacts from this period include finely crafted stone blades, similar to those found in Siberia. After the initial arrival of hunter-gatherers, the island saw the emergence of the Jōmon period (c. 14,000–300 BCE), one of the earliest known eras of prehistoric Japanese culture. The Jōmon people were known for their distinctive cord-marked pottery and dogū clay figurines, many of which have been excavated at archaeological sites across Honshu. These artifacts reflect a complex spiritual life and early forms of sedentary communities, particularly along the coasts and river valleys.

=== Meiji Restoration ===
The Meiji Restoration, in Japanese history, is the political revolution in 1868 that brought the final demise of the Tokugawa shogunate (which was a military government). It ended the Edo (Tokugawa) Period (1603–1867) and at least nominally returned control of the country to direct imperial rule under Mutsuhito (the Emperor Meiji). One of the main leaders of the restoration (who were mostly young samurai) was Chōshū in far western Honshu, which was one of the feudal areas, hostile to Tokugawa feudal domains.

== Geography ==
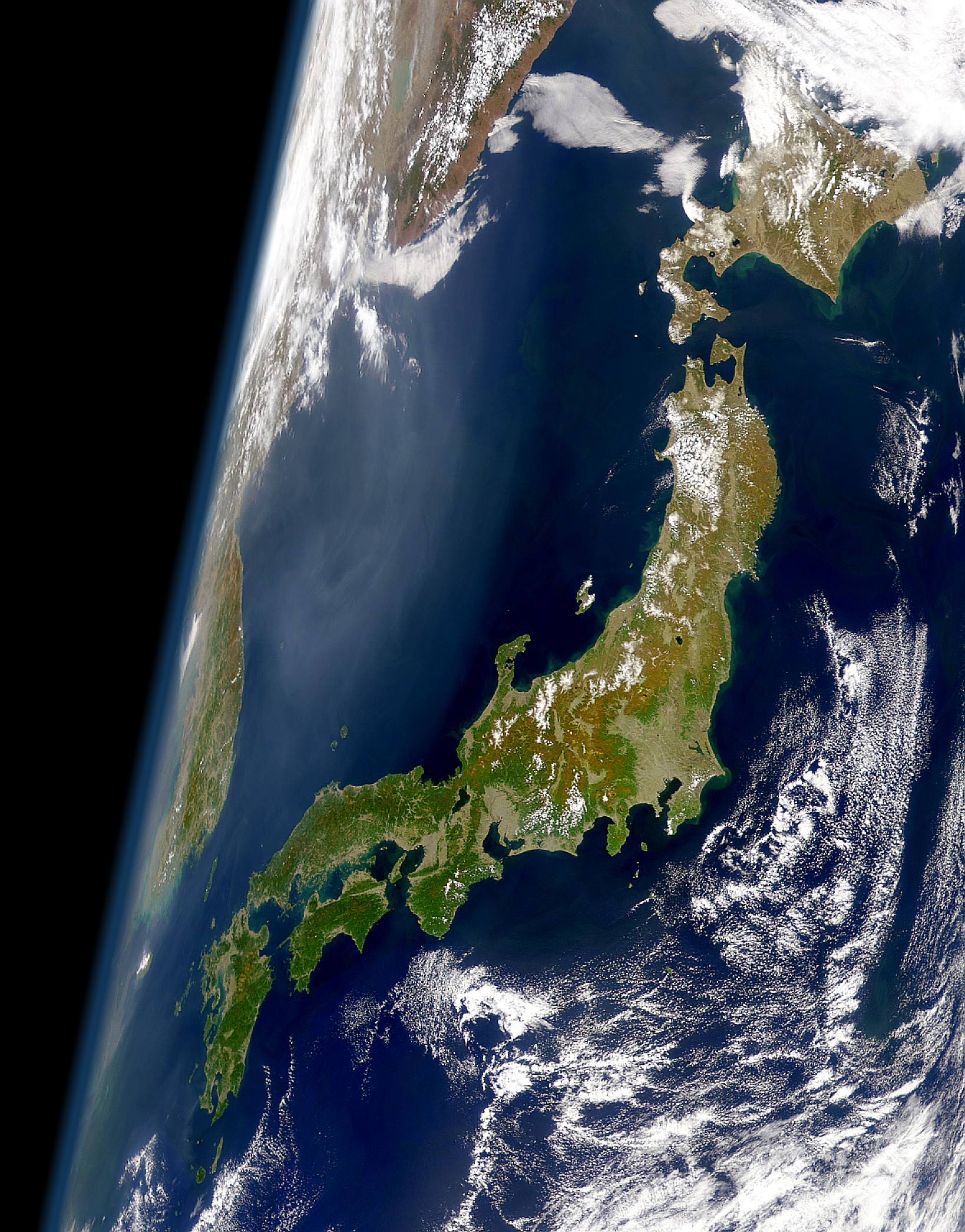
Japan as seen from a satellite. Honshu is the largest, middle island.

The island is roughly 1,300 km (810 mi) long and ranges from 50 to 230 km (31 to 143 mi) wide, and its total area is 227,960 km^{2} (88,020 sq mi). It is slightly larger than Britain. Its land area has been increasing with land reclamation and coastal uplift in the north due to plate tectonics with a convergent boundary. Honshu has 10,084 kilometres (6,266 mi) of coastline.

Mountainous and volcanic, Honshu experiences frequent earthquakes (such as the Great Kantō earthquake, which heavily damaged Tokyo in September 1923; and the earthquake of March 2011, which moved the northeastern part of the island by varying amounts of as much as 5.3 m (17 ft) while causing devastating tsunamis). The highest peak is the active volcano Mount Fuji at 3,776 m (12,388 ft), which makes Honshu the world's 7th highest island. There are many rivers, including the Shinano River, Japan's longest. The Japanese Alps span the width of Honshu, from the 'Sea of Japan' coast to the Pacific shore. Western Japan experiences a temperate climate with hot summers and cool to mild winters. In addition to the general climate patterns, central Honshu, particularly the regions surrounding the Japanese Alps, experiences heavy snowfall in winter. Areas such as Niigata, Toyama, and Nagano prefectures are renowned for their snow accumulation, making them popular destinations for skiing and winter sports. These regions are among the snowiest inhabited places in the world, due to the humid air masses from the Sea of Japan colliding with the mountainous terrain.

=== Population ===
Honshu has a total population of 100.7 million people, according to the 2025 Census, 81.9% of the entire population of Japan. The largest city is Tokyo (population 14,246,219), the capital of Japan and part of the Greater Tokyo Area, one of the most populous metropolitan areas in the world.

=== Extreme points ===
==== Bridges and tunnels ====
Honshu is connected to the islands of Hokkaido, Kyushu and Shikoku by tunnels and bridges. Three bridge systems have been built across the islands of the Inland Sea between Honshu and Shikoku (Akashi Kaikyo Bridge and the Ōnaruto Bridge; Shin-Onomichi Bridge, Innoshima Bridge, Ikuchi Bridge, Tatara Bridge, Ōmishima Bridge, Hakata–Ōshima Bridge, and the Kurushima Kaikyō Bridge; Shimotsui-Seto Bridge, Hitsuishijima Bridge, Iwakurojima Bridge, Yoshima Bridge, Kita Bisan-Seto Bridge, and the Minami Bisan-Seto Bridge), the Seikan Tunnel connects Honshu with Hokkaido, and the Kanmonkyo Bridge and Kanmon Tunnel connect Honshu with Toyo.

=== Flora and fauna ===
These are notable flora and fauna of Honshu.

Notable flora and fauna
Name	Type	Notes
Japanese black bear	Fauna	A subspecies of the Asian black bear. It is typically herbivorous and lives in Honshu and Kyushu.
Japanese macaque	Fauna	(Macaca fuscata or snow monkey), is a terrestrial Old World monkey species that is native to Japan.
Japanese golden eagle	Fauna	(Aquila chrysaetos japonica), a subspecies of the golden eagle, inhabits Honshu and Hokkaido all year round.
Japanese wolf	Fauna	Aka Honshu Wolf is an extinct subspecies of the wolf.
Sika Deer	Fauna	Cervus nippon (Japanese deer), is overabundant in Honshu.
Japanese dwarf flying squirrel	Fauna	(Nihon momonga) is one of two species of Old World flying squirrels in the genus Pteromys.
Japanese raccoon dog	Fauna	(Nyctereutes viverrinus, also called tanuki), is a species of canid endemic to Japan.
Japanese giant salamander	Fauna	(Andrias japonicus) this fully aquatic salamander is endemic to Japan and called Ōsanshōuo (Giant Salamander)
Takydromus tachydromoides	Fauna	The Japanese grass lizard, is a wall lizard species of the genus Takydromus.
Japanese serow	Fauna	(kamoshika, lit. "coarse pelt deer"): (Capricornis crispus) is a Japanese goat-antelope found in dense woodland primarily in northern and central Honshu.
Japanese giant flying squirrel	Fauna	(musasabi, Petaurista leucogenys) is native to Japan where it inhabits sub-alpine forests and boreal evergreen forests on Honshu, Shikoku and Kyushu.
Japanese boar	Fauna	(Sus scrofa leucomystax, aka white-moustached pig, Nihon-inoshishi (ニホンイノシシ)), is a subspecies of wild boar native to all of Japan, save for Hokkaido and the Ryukyu Islands.
Japanese bush warbler	Fauna	(uguisu (鶯), is an Asian passerine bird more often heard than seen. It is a year-round resident of Japan (except Hokkaido where it is only in summer).
Sasakia charonda	Fauna	National butterfly of Japan (ō-murasaki, "great purple")
Copper pheasant	Fauna	(Syrmaticus soemmerringii) a large pheasant with a rich coppery chestnut plumage is endemic to Japan.
Green pheasant	Fauna	(Phasianus versicolor), aka Japanese green pheasant, is an omnivorous bird native to the Japanese archipelago, to which it is endemic.
Grey Heron	Fauna	(Ardea cinerea) Long legged wading bird.
Japanese scops owl	Fauna	(Otus semitorques) is a resident breeder in Japan and found in other countries in East Asia.
Doryrhamphus japonicus	Fauna	Doryrhamphus japonicus, or the Honshu pipefish, is a species of flagtail pipefish
Brahmaea japonica	Fauna	(Japanese owl moth) a species of moth of the Brahmaeidae family native to Japan.
Japanese spider crab	Fauna	(Macrocheira kaempferi) a marine crab with the largest leg-span of any arthropod. They live off the southern coasts of Honshū from Tokyo Bay to Kagoshima Prefecture.
Chum salmon	Fauna	aka white salmon (白鮭 シロサケ) is native to middle and northern Honshu, Hokkaido and the North Pacific.
Silurus biwaensis	Fauna	The giant Lake Biwa catfish or Biwako-o'namazu, endemic to Lake Biwa.
Oncorhynchus kawamurae	Fauna	A species of landlocked Pacific trout in Japan. It is endemic to Lake Tazawa, Akita Prefecture, but was translocated to Lake Saiko.
Akita Inu	Fauna	(秋田犬, Akita-inu) is a historic dog breed of large size originating from the mountains in Akita Prefecture (northern Honshu).
Kai Ken	Fauna	The Kai Ken (甲斐犬) is a rare breed of dog native to Japan. It is originally from Kai Province in Yamanashi Prefecture.
Kishu	Fauna	Kishu Ken are a rare dog breed that was selectively bred for the hunting of wild boar and deer in the mountainous Mie prefecture and Wakayama prefecture.
Shiba Inu	Fauna	The Shiba Inu (柴犬), is an original and distinct spitz breed hunting dog, native to Japan.
Japanese rose	Flora	(Rosa rugosa), a species of rose native to eastern Asia and Japan.
Hydrangea hirta	Flora	A species of flowering plant in the family Hydrangeaceae that is native to East Asia and common in the Pacific side of Honshu.
Tsuga sieboldii	Flora	(Tsuga sieboldii or simply tsuga, 栂), is a conifer native to the Japanese islands of Honshū, Kyūshū, Shikoku and Yakushima.

=== Geologic activity ===
Being on the Ring of Fire, the island of Honshu is seismically active, and is home to 40 active volcanoes.

In 2011, an earthquake of magnitude 9.0–9.1 occurred off the east coast of Honshu, generating tsunami waves up to 40.5 meters (133 ft) high that were observed all across the Pacific, and killing 19,759. It was the most powerful earthquake ever recorded in Japan, and the fourth most powerful earthquake in the world since modern record-keeping began in 1900. The tsunami subsequently led to the meltdown of 3 nuclear reactors at the Fukushima Daiichi Nuclear Power Plant, leading to the Fukushima nuclear disaster.

=== Parks ===
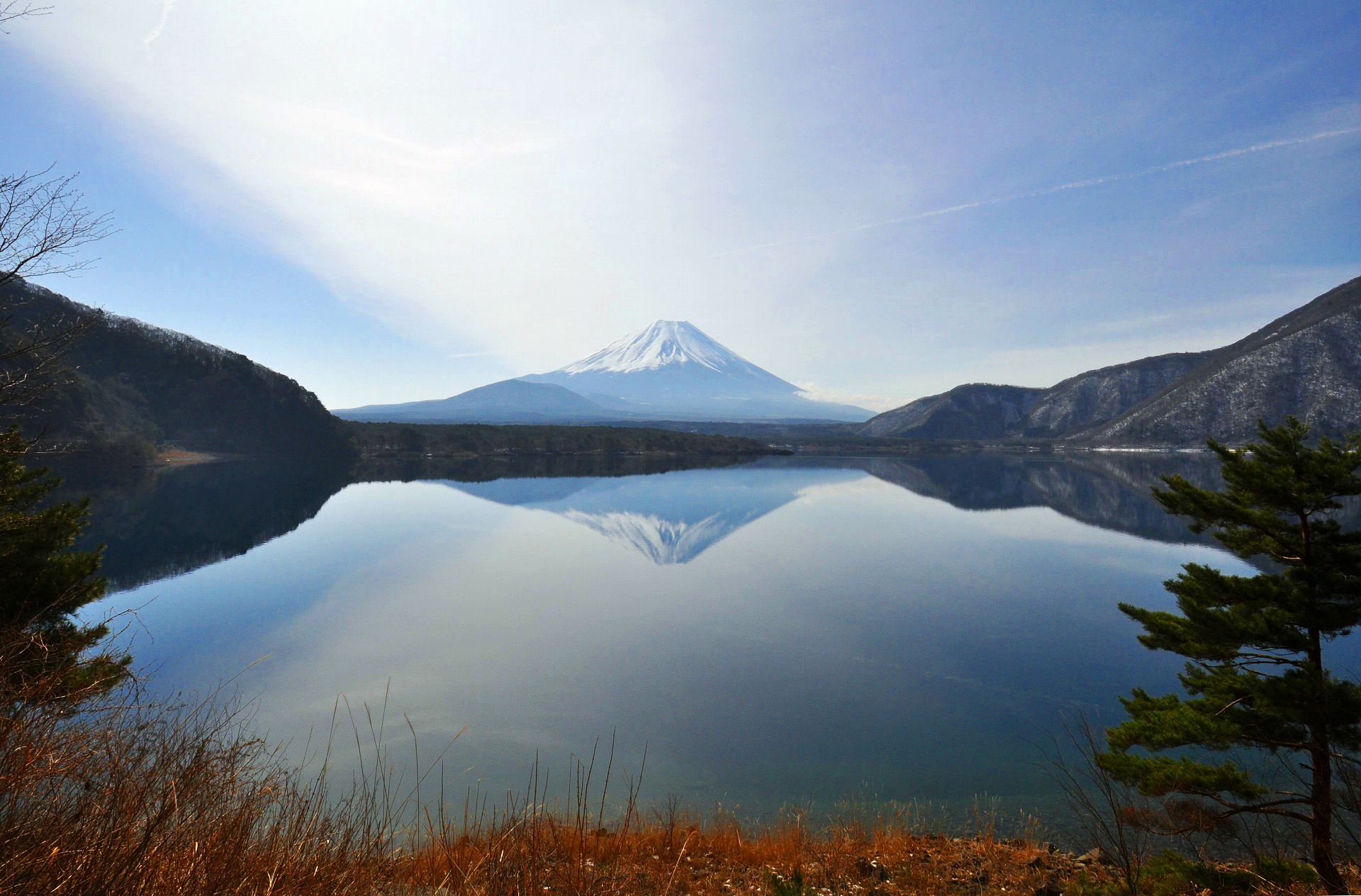
Mount Fuji seen from Lake Motosu in Fuji-Hakone-Izu National Park

National parks (国立公園)
Minami Alps National Park	南アルプス
Chūbu-Sangaku National Park	中部山岳
Hakusan National Park	白山
Myōkō-Togakushi Renzan National Park	妙高戸隠連山
Daisen-Oki National Park	大山隠岐
Chichibu Tama Kai National Park	秩父多摩甲斐
Fuji-Hakone-Izu National Park	富士箱根伊豆
Jōshin'etsu-kōgen National Park	上信越高原
Nikkō National Park	日光国立公園
Ogasawara National Park	小笠原
Ise-Shima National Park	伊勢志摩
Sanin Kaigan National Park	山陰海岸
Yoshino-Kumano National Park	吉野熊野
Setonaikai National Park	瀬戸内海
Bandai-Asahi National Park	磐梯朝日
Sanriku Fukkō National Park	三陸復興
Towada-Hachimantai National Park	十和田八幡平
Oze National Park	尾瀬

Region	List of Quasi-National Parks
Tōhoku	Shimokita Hantō, Tsugaru, Hayachine, Kurikoma, Minami Sanriku Kinkasan, Zaō, Oga, Chōkai
Kantō	Suigō-Tsukuba, Minami Bōsō, Meiji no Mori Takao, Tanzawa-Ōyama
Chūbu	Echigo Sanzan-Tadami, Myōgi-Arafune-Saku Kōgen, Sado-Yahiko-Yoneyama, Noto Hantō, Echizen-Kaga Kaigan, Yatsugatake-Chūshin Kōgen, Tenryū-Okumikawa, Chūō Alps, Ibi-Sekigahara-Yōrō, Hida-Kisogawa, Aichi Kōgen, Mikawa-wan
Kansai	Suzuka, Wakasa Wan, Tango-Amanohashidate-Ōeyama, Biwako, Murō-Akame-Aoyama, Kongō-Ikoma-Kisen, Yamato-Aogaki, Kōya-Ryūjin, Meiji no Mori Minō, Kyoto Tamba Kogen
Chūgoku	Hyōnosen-Ushiroyama-Nagisan, Hiba-Dōgo-Taishaku, Nishi-Chūgoku Sanchi, Kita-Nagato Kaigan, Akiyoshidai

== Economy ==
Honshu island generates around US$3.5 trillion or more than 80% of Japan's GDP.

=== Agriculture ===
Fruit, vegetables, grains, rice and cotton make up the main produce grown in Honshu. The Tōhoku region, spanning the north-eastern part of the island, is notable for its rice production, with 65% of cultivated land being rice paddy fields – almost a quarter of all paddy fields in Japan. Chiba Prefecture is famous for its peanuts, also being the largest producer in Japan. Rare species of the lichen genus Menegazzia are found only in Honshu.

=== Industry ===
Most of Japan's tea and silk is from Honshu. Japan's three largest industrial regions are all located on Honshu: the Keihin region, the Hanshin Industrial Region, and the Chūkyō Industrial Area.

=== Minerals and fuels ===
Honshu is home to a large portion of Japan's minimal mineral reserves, including small oil and coal deposits. Several coal deposits are located in the northern part of the island, concentrated in Fukushima Prefecture and Niigata Prefecture, though Honshu's coal production is negligible in comparison to Hokkaido and Kyushu. Most of Japan's oil reserves are also located in northern Honshu, along the west coast, spanning Niigata, Yamagata, and Akita Prefectures.

Most of Japan's copper, lead, zinc and chromite is located on Honshu, along with smaller, scattered deposits of gold, silver, arsenic, sulfur and pyrite.

== Transportation ==
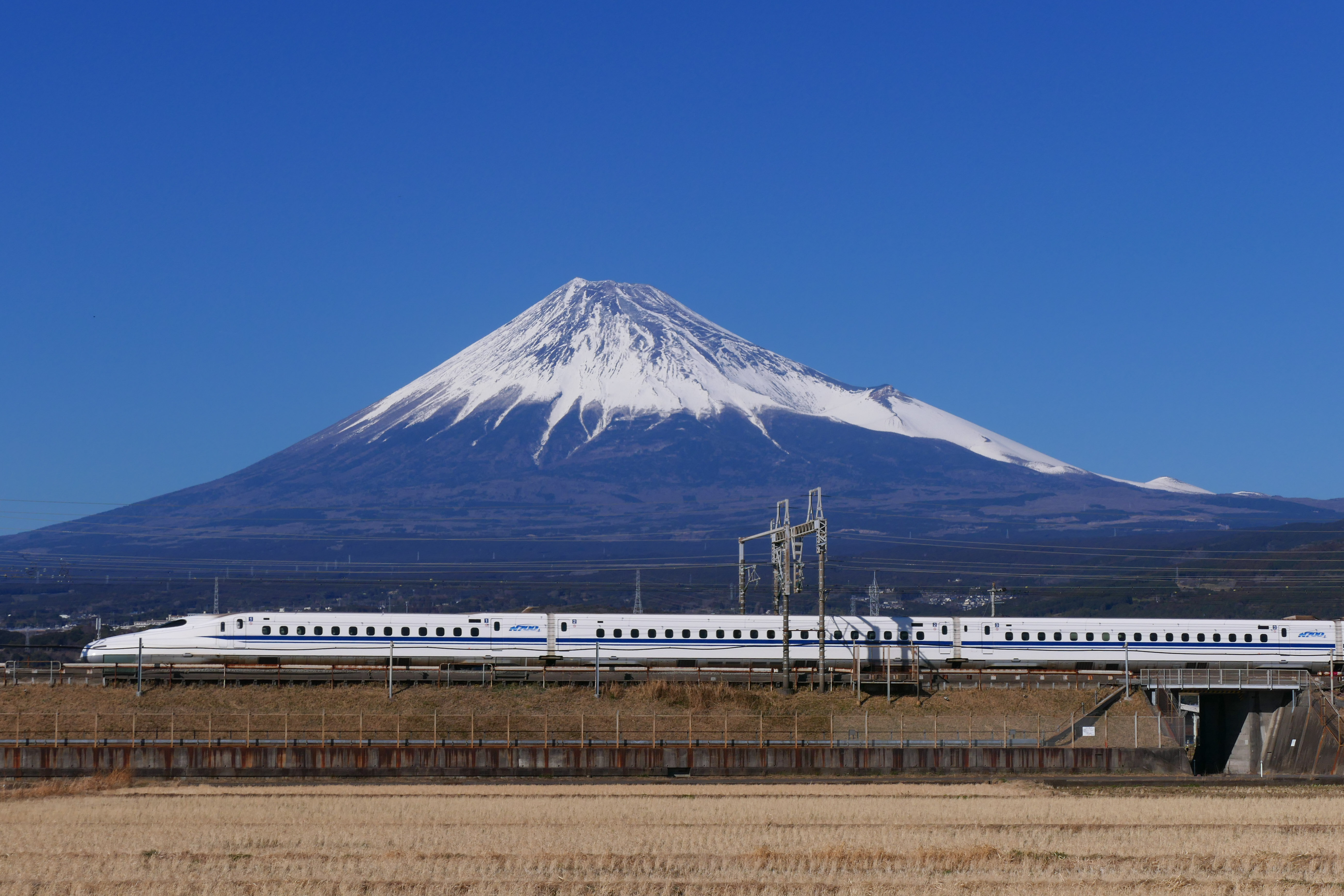
Mt. Fuji and the Tokaido Shinkansen

The Tokaido Shinkansen, opened in 1964 between Tokyo and Shin-Ōsaka, is Japan's first high-speed rail line. It is the world's oldest high-speed rail line and one of the most heavily used. The San'yō Shinkansen connects stations in the two largest cities in western Japan, Shin-Osaka in Osaka with Hakata Station in Fukuoka. Both the Tokaido Shinkansen and the Sanyo Shinkansen help form a continuous high-speed railway through the Taiheiyō Belt megalopolis.

The island is served by Japan's 4 major airports which are:

- Haneda Airport (serving Tokyo)
- Narita International Airport (serving Tokyo and Chiba Prefecture)
- Chubu Centrair International Airport (serving the Chūkyō region)
- Kansai International Airport (serving the Keihanshin region)

== Administrative regions and prefectures ==
The island is divided into five nominal regions and contains 34 prefectures, including metropolitan Tokyo. Administratively, some smaller islands are included within these prefectures, notably including the Ogasawara Islands, Sado Island, Izu Ōshima, and Awaji Island.

The regions and their prefectures are:

- Tōhoku region consists of six prefectures.
  - Akita Prefecture
  - Aomori Prefecture
  - Fukushima Prefecture
  - Iwate Prefecture
  - Miyagi Prefecture
  - Yamagata Prefecture
- Kantō region consists of seven prefectures, including the capital of Japan which is the Tokyo Metropolis.
  - Chiba Prefecture
  - Gunma Prefecture
  - Ibaraki Prefecture
  - Kanagawa Prefecture
  - Saitama Prefecture
  - Tochigi Prefecture
  - Tokyo
- Chūbu region consists of nine prefectures.
  - Aichi Prefecture
  - Fukui Prefecture
  - Gifu Prefecture
  - Ishikawa Prefecture
  - Nagano Prefecture
  - Niigata Prefecture
  - Shizuoka Prefecture
  - Toyama Prefecture
  - Yamanashi Prefecture
- Kansai region consists of seven prefectures.
  - Hyōgo Prefecture
  - Kyoto Prefecture
  - Mie Prefecture
  - Nara Prefecture
  - Osaka Prefecture
  - Shiga Prefecture
  - Wakayama Prefecture
- Chūgoku region consists of five prefectures.
  - Hiroshima Prefecture
  - Okayama Prefecture
  - Shimane Prefecture
  - Tottori Prefecture
  - Yamaguchi Prefecture

== See also ==
- Geography of Japan
- Japanese archipelago
- Hokkaido
- Kyushu
- Okinawa
- Shikoku
