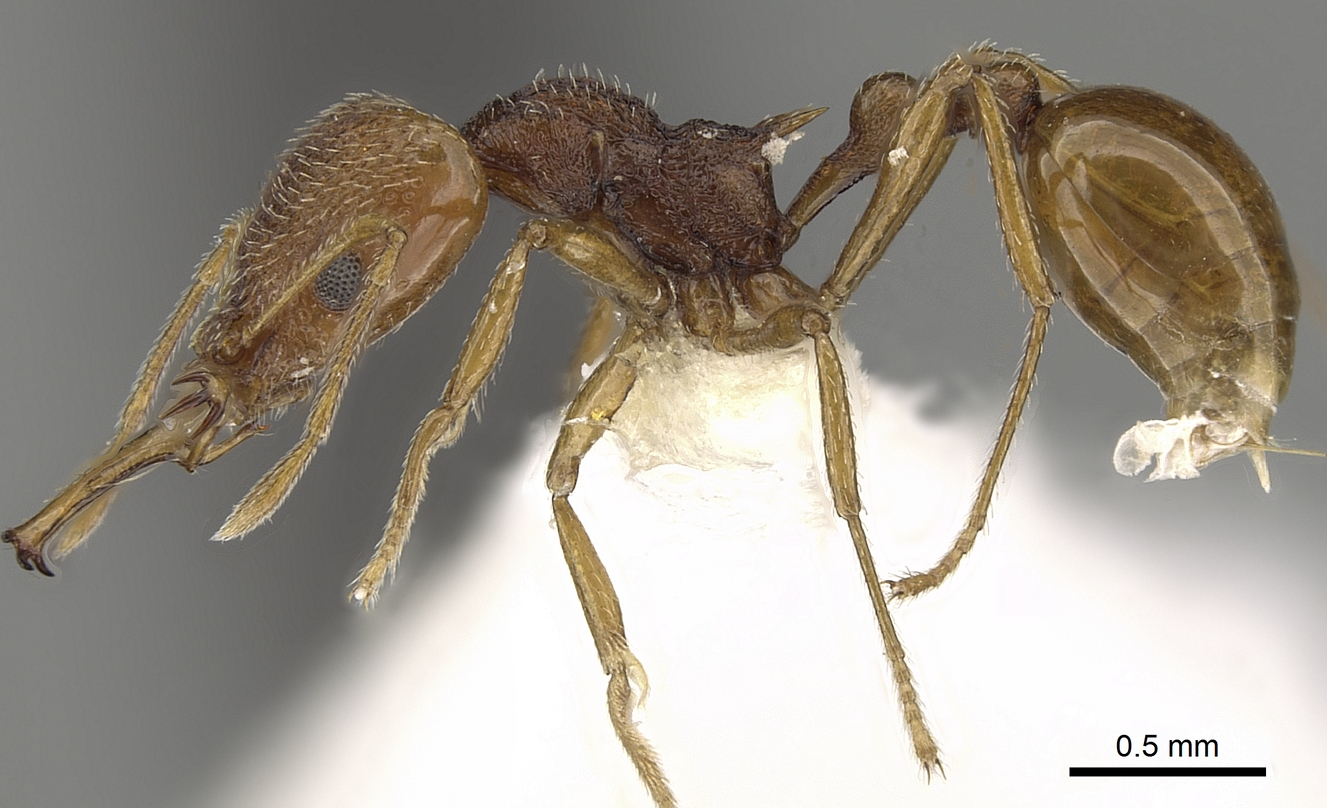

Scientific classification
- Domain: Eukaryota
- Kingdom: Animalia
- Phylum: Arthropoda
- Class: Insecta
- Order: Hymenoptera
- Family: Formicidae
- Subfamily: Myrmicinae
- Genus: Acanthognathus
- Species: A. rudis

Binomial name
- Acanthognathus rudis Brown & Kempf, 1969

= Acanthognathus rudis =

Species of ant

Acanthognathus rudis is a species of ant belonging to the genus Acanthognathus. Described in 1969 by Brown & Kempf, the species is native to South America.
