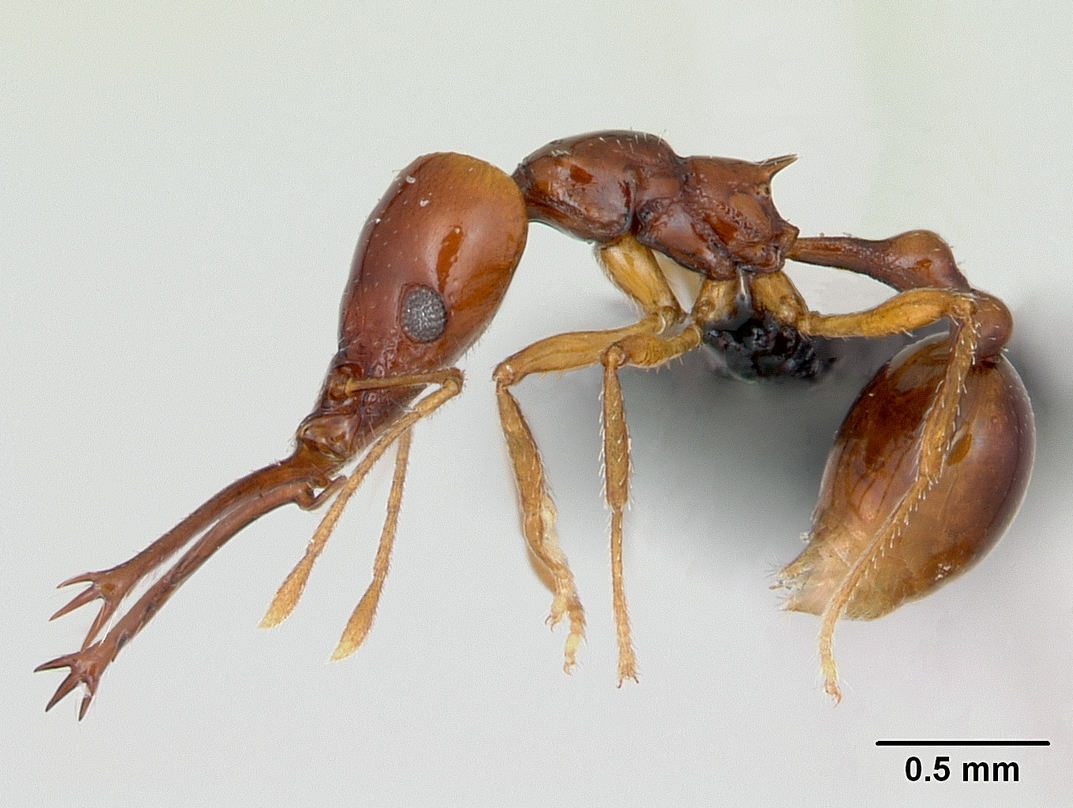
- Acanthognathus teledectus worker

Scientific classification
- Kingdom: Animalia
- Phylum: Arthropoda
- Clade: Pancrustacea
- Class: Insecta
- Order: Hymenoptera
- Family: Formicidae
- Subfamily: Myrmicinae
- Tribe: Attini
- Genus: Acanthognathus; Mayr, 1887

Type species
- Acanthognathus ocellatus Mayr, 1887

= Acanthognathus =

Genus of ants

Acanthognathus (Greek: ákantha = thorn, gnáthos = jaw) is a genus of ants that are found in tropical Central and South America. There are 7 living species and 1 extinct species, Acanthognathus poinari, known only from fossil records.

== Description ==
They are reddish in colour and have long trap-jaws that can be compared to those of Odontomachus. These predatory ants live in small colonies that typically consist of less than 30 adults.

Acanthognathus has large, line-shaped jaws, each with an apical fork of 3 spiniform teeth that interlock when fully closed; Preapical dentition sometimes present but often absent. Jaws open to 170 degrees or more. Basal process of mandible a long curved spur that is minutely bifurcated apically; when the mandibles are fully closed, the basal processes intersect and are ventral to the labrum and at the apex of the labio-maxillary complex; when fully open the mandibles are held in that position by opposition of the basal processes alone. Trigger hairs arise from mandibles (one of each); trigger hairs lie flat against margin when jaws close, becoming erect when the jaws are open.

== Taxonomy ==
The genus was established by Mayr (1887) to house the species A. ocellatus, described from a single worker found in Brazil.

Mistakenly, the name Acanthognathus was re-used by German ichthyologist G. Duncker in 1912 for a genus of syngnathid fish, but that is invalid as it is a junior homonym. These are now placed in either Dunckerocampus or Doryrhamphus, as the former sometimes is considered a subgenus of the latter. To further confuse, a genus of nemesiid spiders, Acanthogonatus, is frequently misspelled Acanthognathus.

== List of species ==
Scientific name	Authority	Picture
Acanthognathus brevicornis	M. R. Smith, 1944	
Acanthognathus laevigatus	Galvis & Fernández, 2009	
Acanthognathus lentus	Mann, 1922	
Acanthognathus ocellatus	Mayr, 1887	
†Acanthognathus poinari	Baroni Urbani & De Andrade, 1994	
Acanthognathus rudis	Brown & Kempf, 1969	
Acanthognathus stipulosus	Brown & Kempf, 1969	
Acanthognathus teledectus	Brown & Kempf, 1969	
