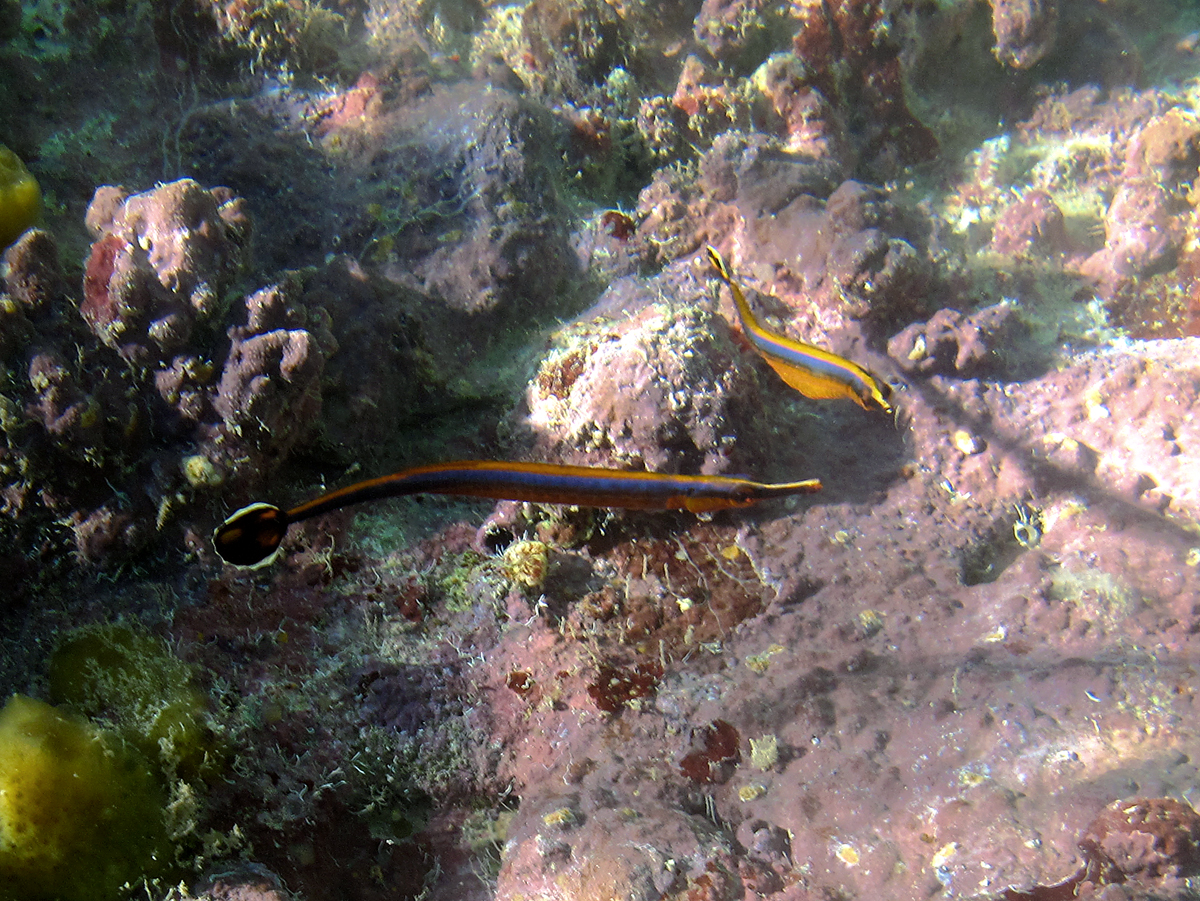

Conservation status
- Data Deficient (IUCN 3.1)

Scientific classification
- Kingdom: Animalia
- Phylum: Chordata
- Class: Actinopterygii
- Order: Syngnathiformes
- Family: Syngnathidae
- Genus: Doryrhamphus
- Species: D. bicarinatus

Binomial name
- Doryrhamphus bicarinatus Dawson, 1981

= Doryrhamphus bicarinatus =

Species of fish

Doryrhamphus bicarinatus, or the narrowstripe pipefish, is a species of flagtail pipefish from the genus Doryrhamphus that occurs in the Western Indian Ocean, Sodwana Bay, South Africa north to Bazaruto Island, Mozambique, as well as the Maldives. It was named by C.E. Dawson in 1981. The fish's maximum length is approximately 8 cm. Males carry eggs in a brood pouch under the tail.
