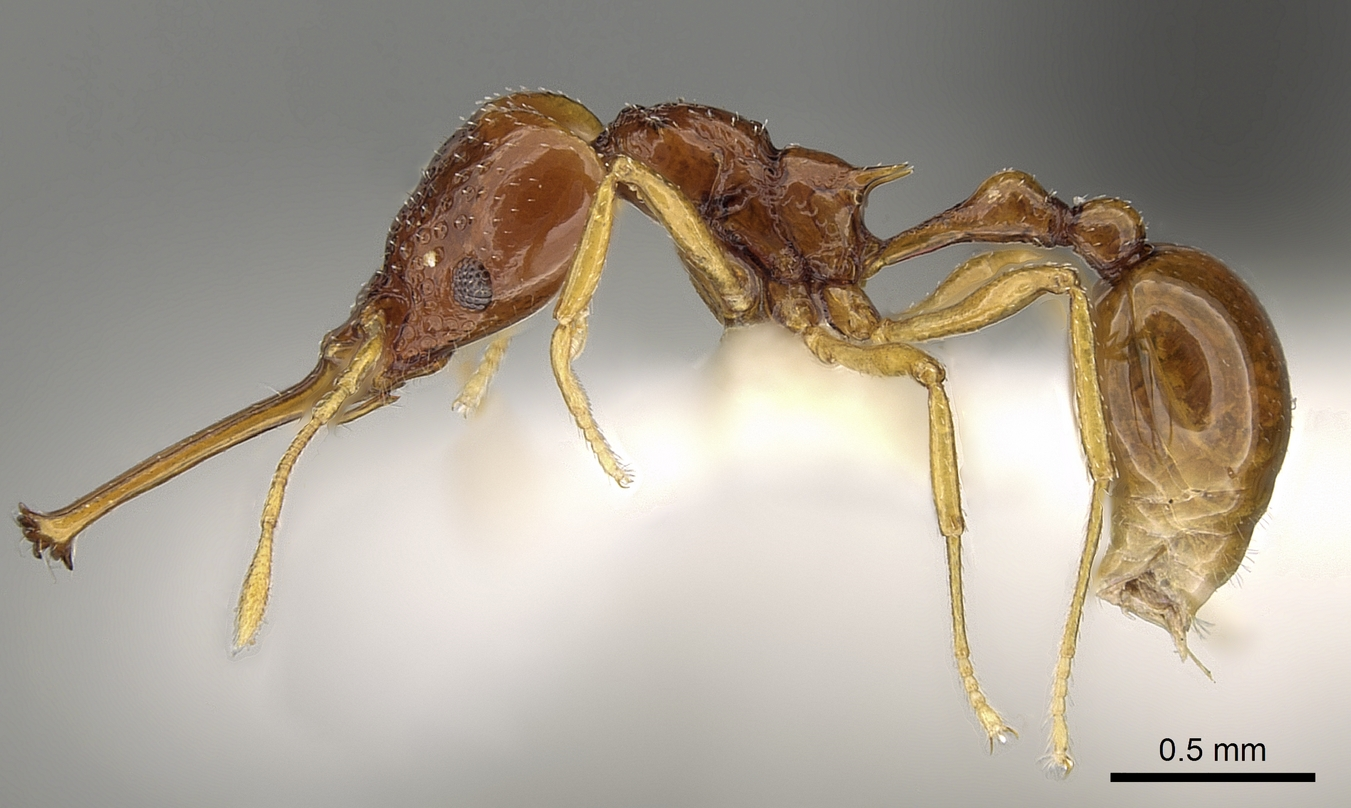

Scientific classification
- Kingdom: Animalia
- Phylum: Arthropoda
- Clade: Pancrustacea
- Class: Insecta
- Order: Hymenoptera
- Family: Formicidae
- Subfamily: Myrmicinae
- Genus: Acanthognathus
- Species: A. brevicornis

Binomial name
- Acanthognathus brevicornis Smith, M.R., 1944

= Acanthognathus brevicornis =

Species of ant

Acanthognathus brevicornis is a species of ant belonging to the genus Acanthognathus. Described in 1944 by Smith, M.R., the species is native to northwestern South America.

== Etymology ==
The specific name comes from Latin brevis, meaning "short", and cornis, meaning "horned".
