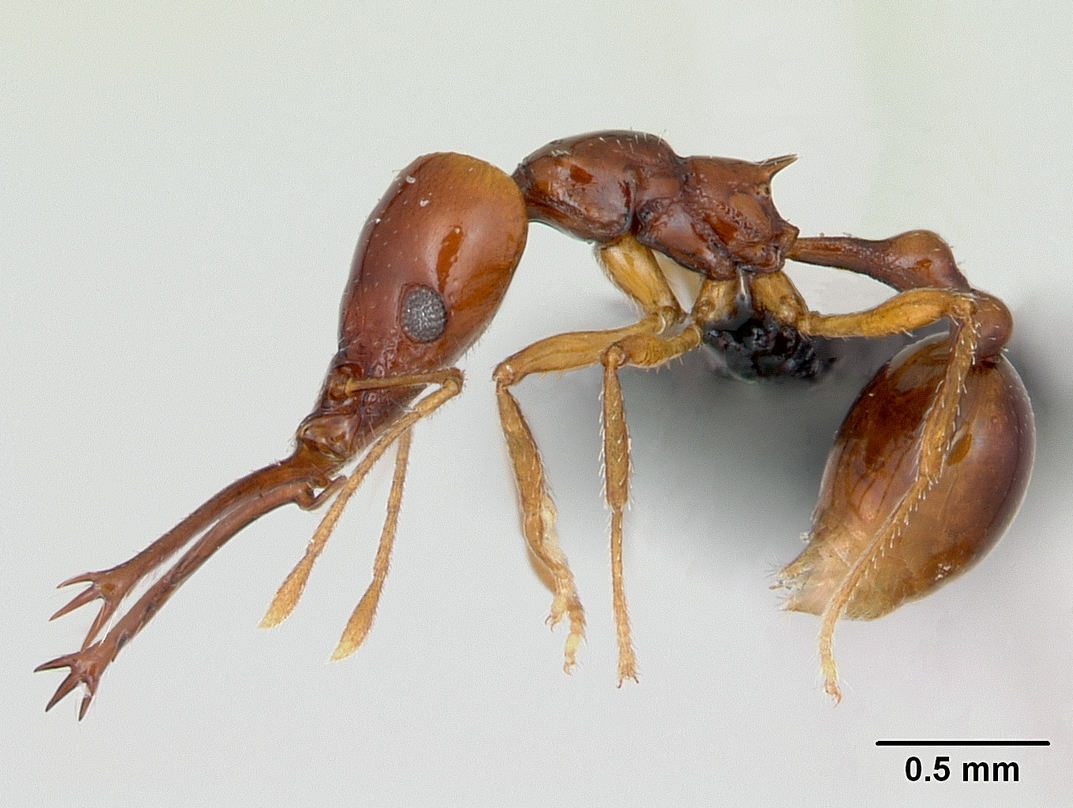
- Acanthognathus teledectus worker

Scientific classification
- Domain: Eukaryota
- Kingdom: Animalia
- Phylum: Arthropoda
- Class: Insecta
- Order: Hymenoptera
- Family: Formicidae
- Subfamily: Myrmicinae
- Genus: Acanthognathus
- Species: A. teledectus

Binomial name
- Acanthognathus teledectus Brown & Kempf, 1969

= Acanthognathus teledectus =

Species of ant

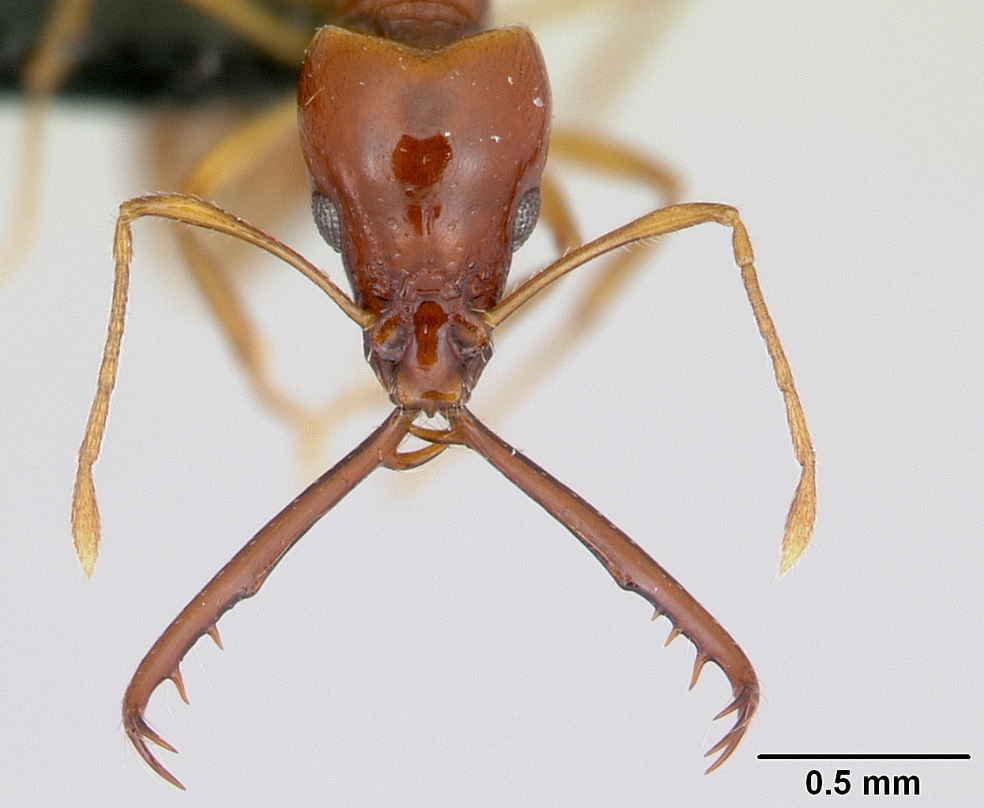

Acanthognathus teledectus is a species of ant belonging to the genus Acanthognathus. Described in 1969 by Brown & Kempf, the species is native to Central America.
