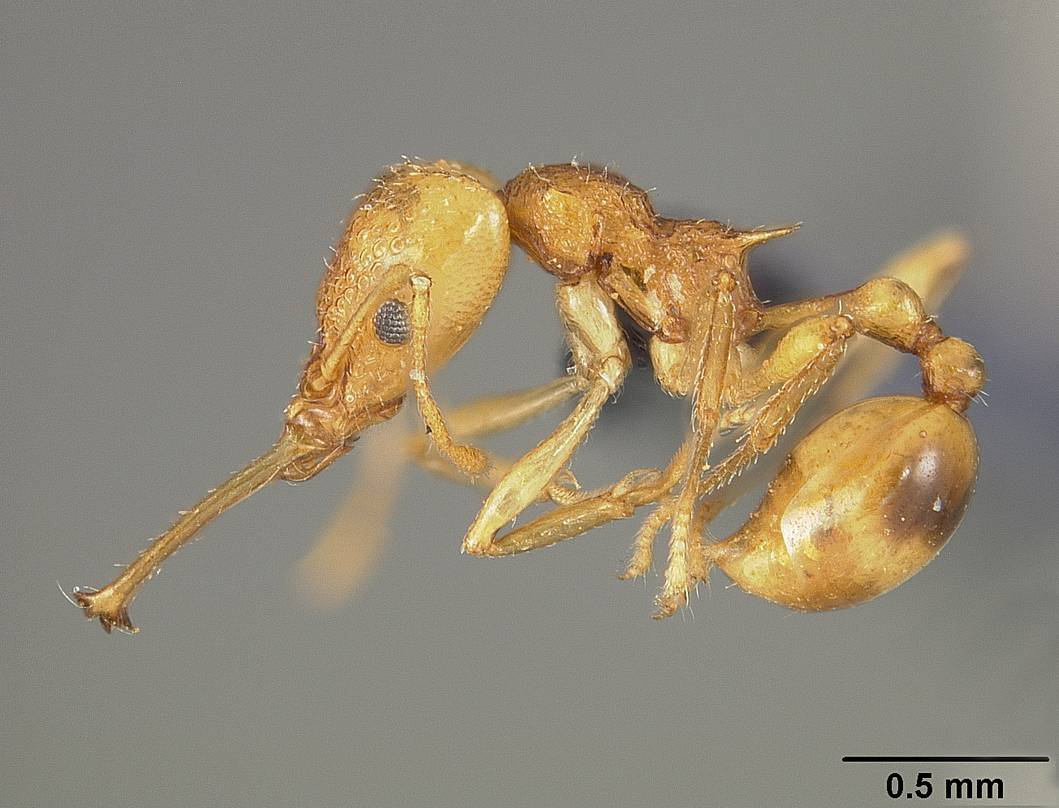

Scientific classification
- Domain: Eukaryota
- Kingdom: Animalia
- Phylum: Arthropoda
- Class: Insecta
- Order: Hymenoptera
- Family: Formicidae
- Subfamily: Myrmicinae
- Genus: Acanthognathus
- Species: A. lentus

Binomial name
- Acanthognathus lentus Mann, 1922

= Acanthognathus lentus =

Species of ant

Acanthognathus lentus is a species of ant belonging to the genus Acanthognathus. Described in 1922 by Mann, the species is native to Central America and South America.
