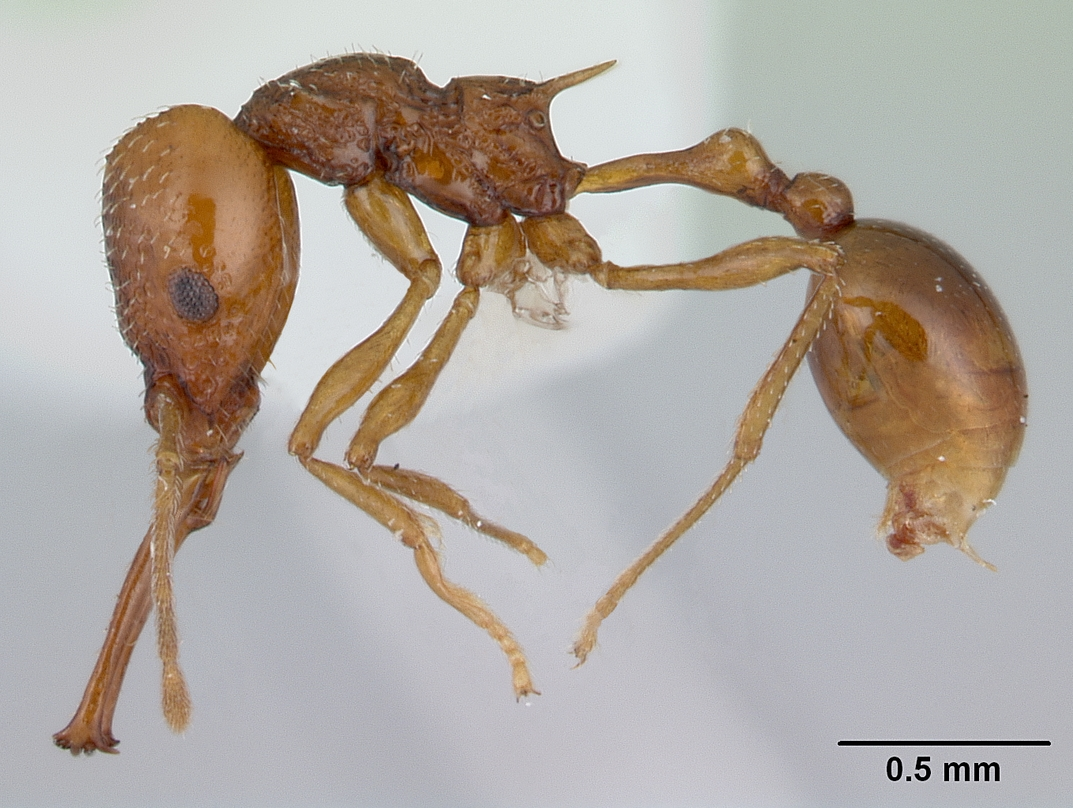
- Acanthognathus ocellatus worker

Scientific classification
- Domain: Eukaryota
- Kingdom: Animalia
- Phylum: Arthropoda
- Class: Insecta
- Order: Hymenoptera
- Family: Formicidae
- Subfamily: Myrmicinae
- Genus: Acanthognathus
- Species: A. ocellatus

Binomial name
- Acanthognathus ocellatus Mayr, 1887

= Acanthognathus ocellatus =

Species of ant

Acanthognathus ocellatus is a species of ant belonging to the genus Acanthognathus. Described in 1887 by Mayr, the species is native to South America and other regions.
