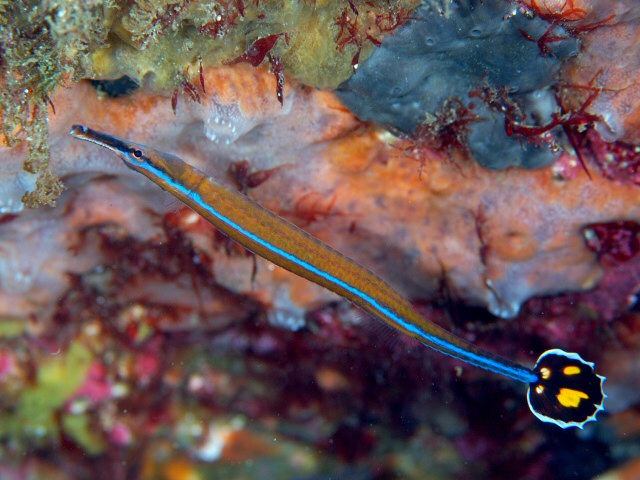
- Honshu pipefish

Conservation status
- Least Concern (IUCN 3.1)

Scientific classification
- Kingdom: Animalia
- Phylum: Chordata
- Class: Actinopterygii
- Order: Syngnathiformes
- Family: Syngnathidae
- Genus: Doryrhamphus
- Species: D. japonicus

Binomial name
- Doryrhamphus japonicus Araga & Yoshino, 1975

= Doryrhamphus japonicus =

Species of fish

Doryrhamphus japonicus, or the Honshu pipefish, is a species of flagtail pipefish from the genus Doryrhamphus that occurs in the Western Pacific Ocean, from Milne Bay, Papua New Guinea, to Sulawesi, Indonesia, the Philippines, and north as far as Honshu, Japan and Korea. It is a marine demersal pipefish that inhabits coastal lagoons, rocky and coral reefs, and tidal pools down to as deep as 30 metres (98 ft) but it is unusual below 10 metres (33 ft). This species is frequently found in association with sea urchins of the genus Diadema and with sponges. It is an active cleaner, feeding on parasites found on other fishes. It frequently shares crevices with shrimps, large mud crabs and occasionally moray eels.
