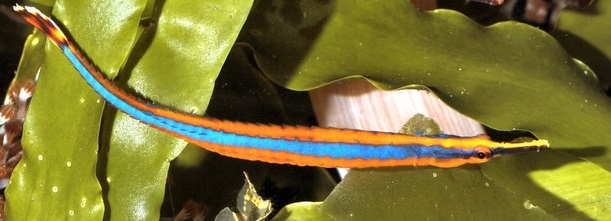
- Blue-and-Orange Cleaner Pipefish Doryrhamphus excisus

Conservation status
- Least Concern (IUCN 3.1)

Scientific classification
- Kingdom: Animalia
- Phylum: Chordata
- Class: Actinopterygii
- Order: Syngnathiformes
- Family: Syngnathidae
- Genus: Doryrhamphus
- Species: D. excisus

Binomial name
- Doryrhamphus excisus Kaup, 1856

Subspecies
- D. e. abbreviatus D. e. excisus D. e. paulus

= Doryrhamphus excisus =

Blue-striped pipefish

Species of fish

Doryrhamphus excisus is a species of flagtail pipefish from the genus Doryrhamphus. Its common names include blue-striped pipefish and blue-and-orange cleaner pipefish. The fish is found throughout much of the Indo-Pacific and tropical East Pacific.

== Taxonomy ==
D. excisus as a species was named by Kaup in 1856. D. melanopleaura, named by Bleeker, is a synonym. The species was eventually split into subspecies, based on distribution. D. excisus abbreviatus was named by Dawson in 1981, D. excisus excisus, by Kaup in 1856, and D. excisus paulus, by Fritzsche in 1980. D. excisus abbreviatus pertains only to the Red Sea subspecies. D. e. paulus is restricted to the Revillagigedo Islands in Mexico.

== Characteristics ==
The species is distinguished by its bluish mid-lateral stripe contrasting an orange or reddish body. Furthermore, it has a fan-like tail. A caudal fin is present, which is rounded with a white outline, the inside mostly black. The fish's snout is elongated.

Males and females of the species grow to an average of 7 cm. A male will have a series of bumps and hooks on the upper surface of its snout, while a female will have a smooth snout. Males mature around lengths of 31 mm.

== Distribution and habitat ==
The species has a wide distribution. It can be found from the Persian Gulf to the coasts of Central America and South America. It has been found in the Indo-Pacific and Western Pacific, inhabiting reef crevices.

The fish has been found in tidepools.

== Behavior ==
The fish may inspect larger fish for parasites in a symbiotic relationship. Two males of the species may fight. They frequently hover in pairs, advertising their presence by swimming in an undulating motion above the substrate and bobbing up and down in the water column, this seems to be to attract larger fish to them to be cleaned and they have been observed picking parasites off moray eels.

During mating, the females deposit eggs into the male's brooding pouch, which located on its underside. The pouch has a lining that supplies the eggs with oxygen as well as nutrients.

=== Diet ===
The blue-and-orange cleaner pipefish's diet includes zooplankton, benthic invertebrates, and parasites from other fishes. Its tube-like snout is used to eat such creatures by taking in water rapidly.

=== In captivity ===
The species is considered peaceful, especially in pairs. Aquarium hobbyists have reported success in feeding the species frozen brine shrimp and mysis shrimp. In an aquarium, they may be found in shady areas during daytime. The species has been reported to breed in a tank.
