= Acanthognathus poinari =

Acanthognathus poinari Temporal range: Burdigalian?

Scientific classification
- Kingdom: Animalia
- Phylum: Arthropoda
- Clade: Pancrustacea
- Class: Insecta
- Order: Hymenoptera
- Family: Formicidae
- Subfamily: Myrmicinae
- Genus: Acanthognathus
- Species: †A. poinari

Binomial name
- †Acanthognathus poinari Baroni Urbani & De Andrade, 1994

Extinct species of ant

Acanthognathus poinari is an extinct species of ant in the subfamily Myrmicinae known from a single possibly Miocene fossil found on Hispaniola. A. poinari is the first species of the ant genus Acanthognathus to have been described from fossils found in Dominican amber and is one of several species of Acanthognathus found in the Greater Antillas.

== History and classification ==
Acanthognathus poinari is known from a solitary fossil insect which, along with six dipteran and a leaf section, is an inclusion in a transparent chunk of Dominican amber. The amber was produced by the extinct Hymenaea protera, which formerly grew on Hispaniola, across northern South America and up to southern Mexico. The specimens were collected from an undetermined amber mine in fossil bearing rocks of the Cordillera Septentrional mountains, northern Dominican Republic. The amber dates from at least the Burdigalian stage of the Miocene, based on studying the associated fossil foraminifera and may be as old as the Middle Eocene, based on the associated fossil coccoliths. This age range is due to the host rock being secondary deposits for the amber, and the Miocene the age range is only the youngest that it might be.

The holotype amber specimen, number H-10-135, is currently preserved in the amber collections of noted amber researcher George Poinar Jr., which at the time of description were housed in the University of California, Berkeley. The fossil was first studied by entomologists Cesare Baroni Urbani and Maria L. De Andrade of the University of Basle with their 1994 type description of the new species being published in the journal Transactions of the American Entomological Society. The specific epithet poinari is a patronym honoring George Poinar for his enthusiasm for amber which interested the authors into study of the specimens.

Prior to the species formal description in 1994 the known distribution of the genus was confined to tropical Central and South America, ranging from Honduras south to Northern Argentina and Southeastern Brazil. Member species are active predators which use highly enlarged and modified trap-jaw mandibles.

== Description ==
The Acanthognathus poinari specimen is well preserved with an estimated body length of 3.00 millimetres (0.118 in), including the enlarged mandibles. The overall coloration of A. poinari is a glossy reddish brown in general, which slightly lightens on the legs and antennae. The antennae are a distinct club shape with 2 joints. The mandibles and scape are slightly shorter than the head in combined length and host a number of sparse hairs. The gaster and petiole are smooth to very faintly punctate or striate, with the stria getting more distinct on the trunk. The head capsule shows distinct strong reticulation and patterning. A. poinari is separated from the living genera by the distinct transverse ornamentation found on the posterior cephalic angles.
