= Doryrhamphus aurolineatus =

Conservation status
- Data Deficient (IUCN 3.1)

Scientific classification
- Kingdom: Animalia
- Phylum: Chordata
- Class: Actinopterygii
- Order: Syngnathiformes
- Family: Syngnathidae
- Genus: Doryrhamphus
- Species: D. aurolineatus

Binomial name
- Doryrhamphus aurolineatus Randall & Earle, 1994

Species of fish

Doryrhamphus aurolineatus is a species of flagtail pipefish from the genus Doryrhamphus that occurs in the Western Indian Ocean. It was named by J. E. Randall and John L. Earle in 1994. The fish may be found near caves, and males carry eggs in a brood pouch under the tail.
