= Doryrhamphus janssi =

Conservation status
- Least Concern (IUCN 3.1)

Scientific classification
- Kingdom: Animalia
- Phylum: Chordata
- Class: Actinopterygii
- Order: Syngnathiformes
- Family: Syngnathidae
- Genus: Doryrhamphus
- Species: D. janssi

Binomial name
- Doryrhamphus janssi (Herald & J. E. Randall, 1972)

Synonyms
- Dentirostrum janssi Herald & Randall, 1972; Dunckerocampus janssi (Herald & Randall, 1972)

Species of fish

Doryrhamphus janssi, commonly known as the Janss' pipefish , is a species of pipefish belonging to the family Syngnathidae.

== Description ==
Doryrhamphus janssi has a long, slender body with an elongated, tubular mouth. It's a small sized fish which can reach a maximal length of 14 cm. The body of this species is bright orange while the head and anterior portion of the trunk are blue. Its tail is flag-like with a black background color, white margin and white dot in the center.

== Distribution & habitat ==
The Janss' pipefish is found in the tropical waters of the central Indo-Pacific area, from Indonesia to the Philippines, this latter is the northern and eastern limit of the species distribution. It likes sheltered inner reef and it is usually observed under small coral overhangs and crevices.

== Biology ==
Doryrhamphus janssi is a cleaner fish specialised in small fish like apogonids and damselfishes, they usually work in couple.

It is ovoviviparous and like for the seahorse, the male carries the eggs in a brood pouch.

== Captivity ==
The Janss' Pipefish is not easily kept because of to its unusual feeding requirements. This fish generally prefers to eat only live copepods.

== Etymology ==
The specific name honours Edwin Janns Jr., a Los Angeles property developer who had a keen interest in marine biology.
