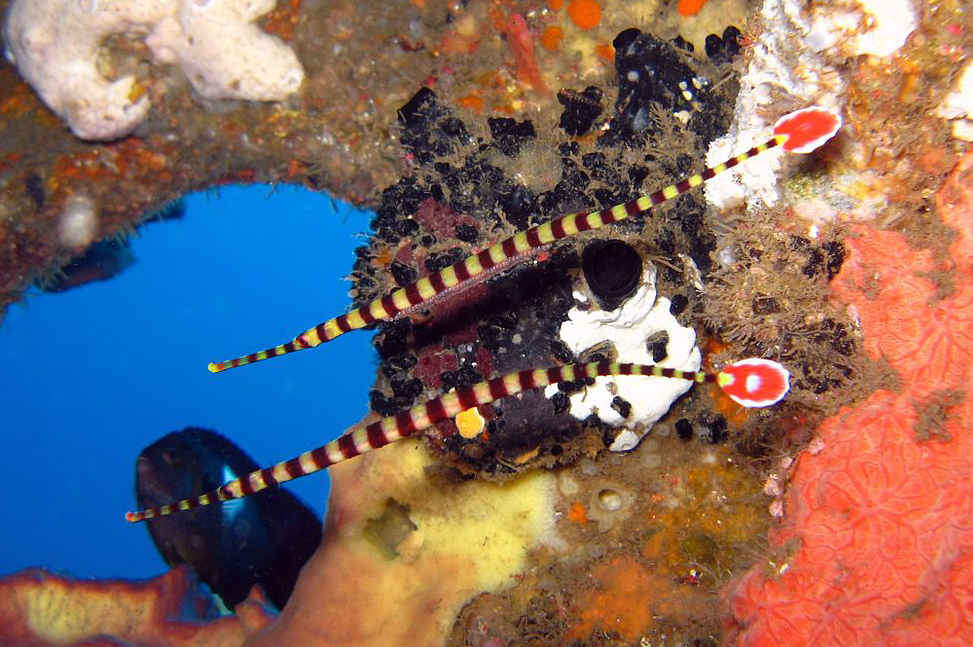
- Indonesia, note the eggs on the abdomen of the male (below)

Conservation status
- Least Concern (IUCN 3.1)

Scientific classification
- Kingdom: Animalia
- Phylum: Chordata
- Class: Actinopterygii
- Order: Syngnathiformes
- Family: Syngnathidae
- Genus: Doryrhamphus
- Species: D. negrosensis

Binomial name
- Doryrhamphus negrosensis Herre, 1934

Synonyms
- Choerichthys suilus malus Whitley, 1954; Doryrhamphus negrosensis malus Whitley, 1954; Doryrhamphus negrosensis negrosensis Herre, 1934; Pristidoryrhamphus jacksoni Fowler, 1944

= Doryrhamphus negrosensis =

Flagtail pipefish

Species of fish

Doryrhamphus negrosensis, commonly known as Negros pipefish, flagtail pipefish, Masthead Island pipefish or Queensland flagtail pipefish, is a species of marine fish of the family Syngnathidae. It is found in the Western Pacific Ocean, from Borneo to Vanuatu and the Yaeyama Islands to the Rowley Shoals and the Great Barrier Reef. It lives in mud flats and reefs, both coral and rocky, where it is often associated with sea urchins. It is a rather solitary species which may be found in pairs or small groups. It inhabits depths to 9 metres (30 ft), and can grow to lengths of 6.2 centimetres (2.4 in). Although little is known of its feeding habits, it is expected to feed on harpacticoid copepods, gammarid shrimps, and mysids, similar to other pipefish, it may also act as a cleaner fish like other species in the genus Doryrhamphus. This species is ovoviviparous, with males carrying eggs before giving birth to live young. Males may brood at 4.3 cm. It is a small bluish to bluish-grey pipefish which has a pale stripe along the dorsal side of the head and snout, and a dark fan-like caudal fin which has white margins and an orange base.
