= Acanthognathus laevigatus =

Scientific classification
- Kingdom: Animalia
- Phylum: Arthropoda
- Clade: Pancrustacea
- Class: Insecta
- Order: Hymenoptera
- Family: Formicidae
- Subfamily: Myrmicinae
- Genus: Acanthognathus
- Species: A. laevigatus

Binomial name
- Acanthognathus laevigatus Galvis & Fernández, 2009

Species of ant

Acanthognathus laevigatus is a species of ant belonging to the genus Acanthognathus. Described in 2009 by Galvis & Fernández, the species is native to Colombia.
