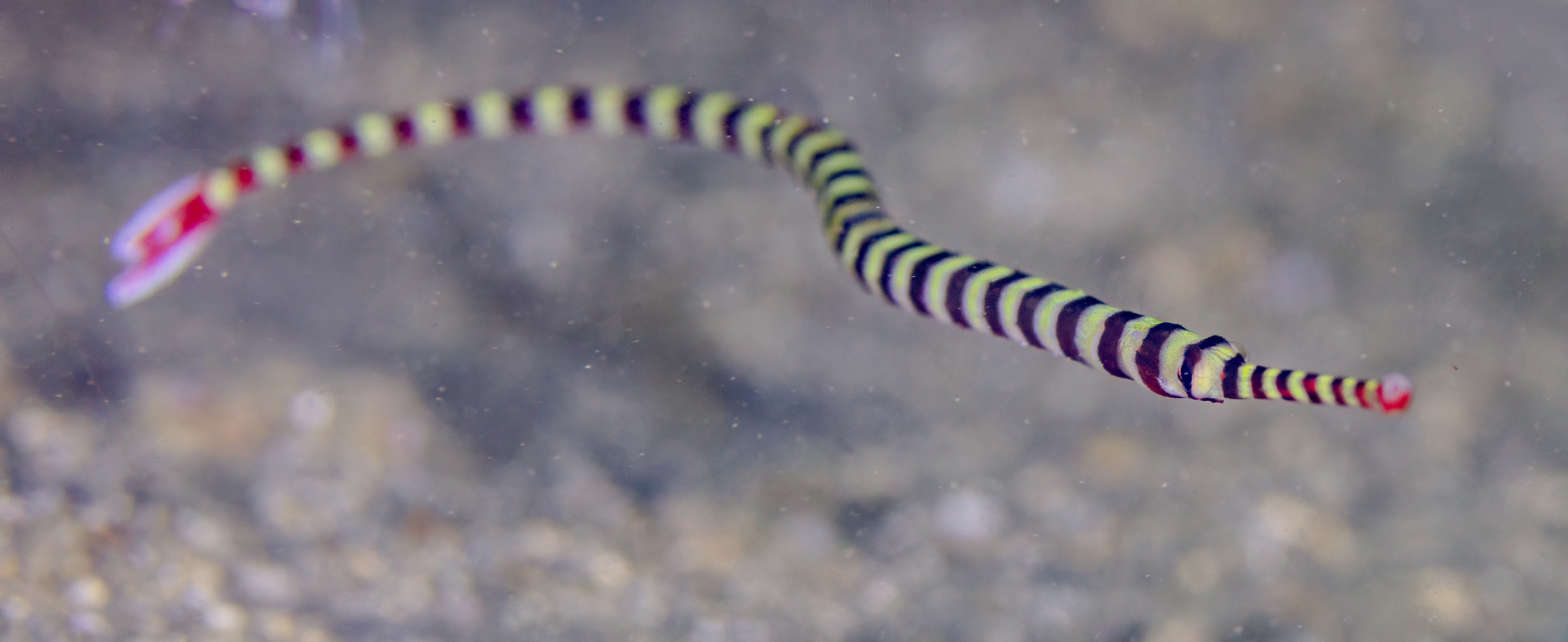

Conservation status
- Data Deficient (IUCN 3.1)

Scientific classification
- Kingdom: Animalia
- Phylum: Chordata
- Class: Actinopterygii
- Order: Syngnathiformes
- Family: Syngnathidae
- Genus: Dunckerocampus
- Species: D. dactyliophorus

Binomial name
- Dunckerocampus dactyliophorus (Bleeker, 1853)

Synonyms
- Syngnathus dactyliophorus Bleeker, 1853; Doryrhamphus dactyliophorus (Bleeker, 1853); Acanthognathus caulleryi Chabanaud, 1929

= Banded pipefish =

Species of fish

The banded pipefish or ringed pipefish (Dunckerocampus dactyliophorus) is a species of fish in the Syngnathidae (seahorses and pipefish) family.

== Distribution and habitat ==
The banded pipefish is widespread throughout the tropical waters of the Indo-Pacific region, Red Sea included. Its range includes Australia, Fiji, French Polynesia, Indonesia, Japan, the Marshall Islands, New Caledonia, Northern Mariana Islands, Papua New Guinea, the Philippines, Samoa, the Solomon Islands, South Africa, and Taiwan. It inhabits tide pools, lagoons, and outer reef slopes in tropical climates.

== Description ==
The banded pipefish has a straight, elongated body which reaches a maximum length of 19 cm (7.4 in). It has fleshy streams coming back from its head. These trails are thought to be mechanisms of camouflage for the pipefish whilst hiding in reeds.

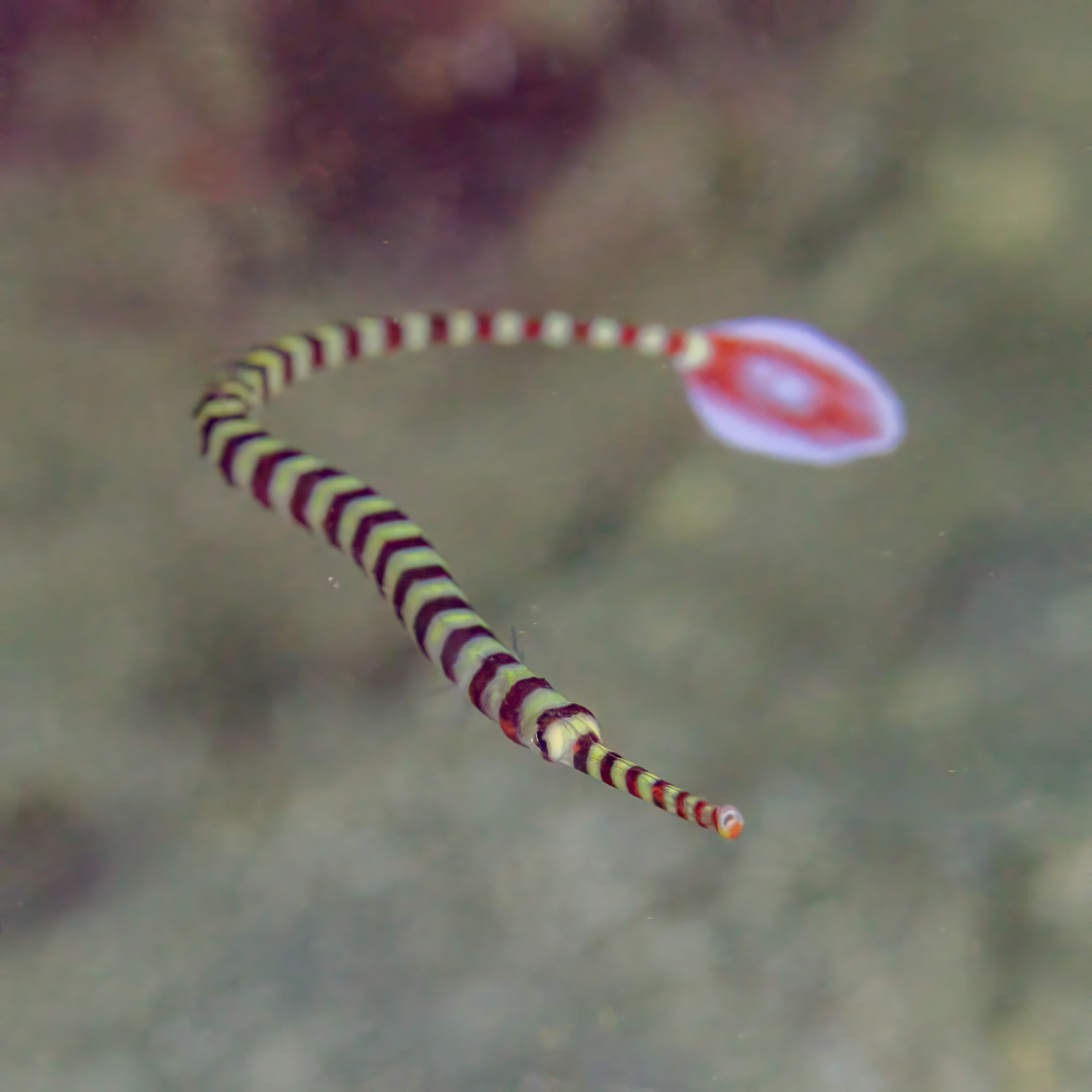
Banded pipefish

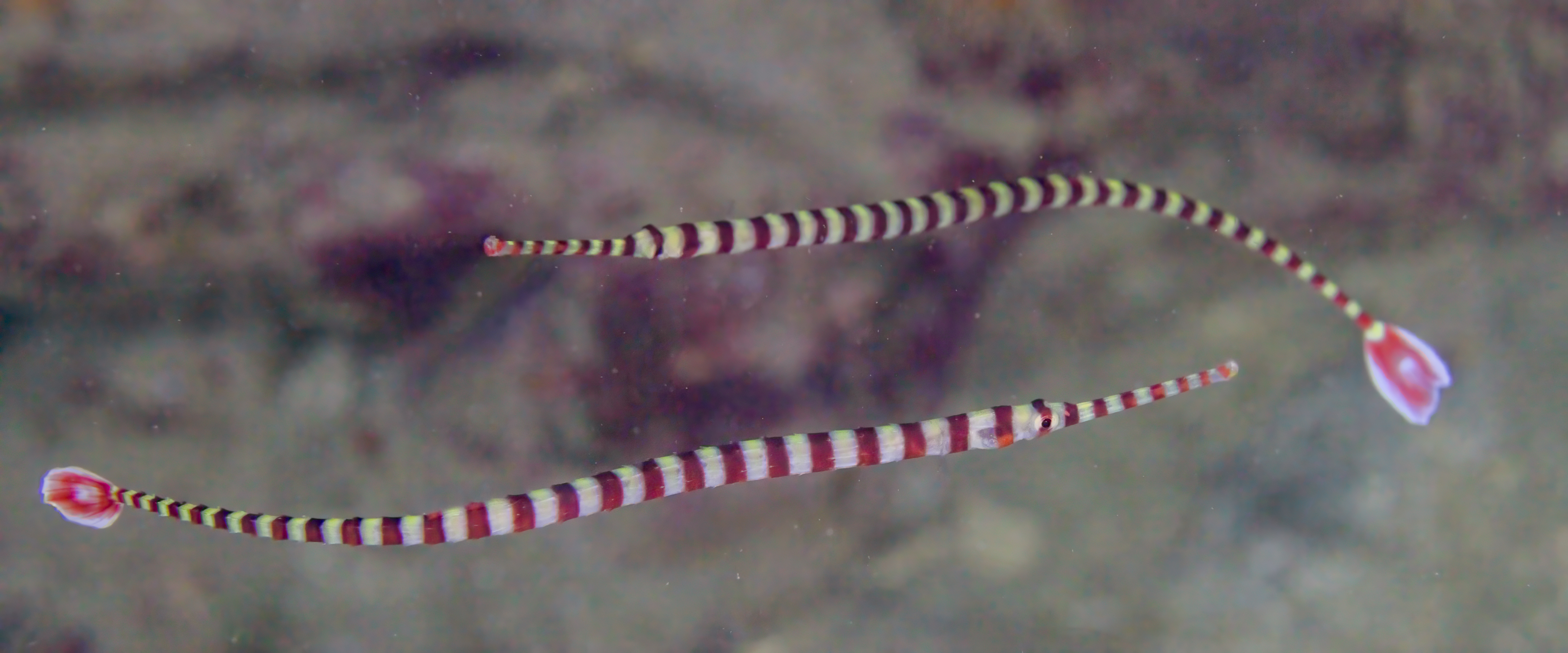
Banded pipefish

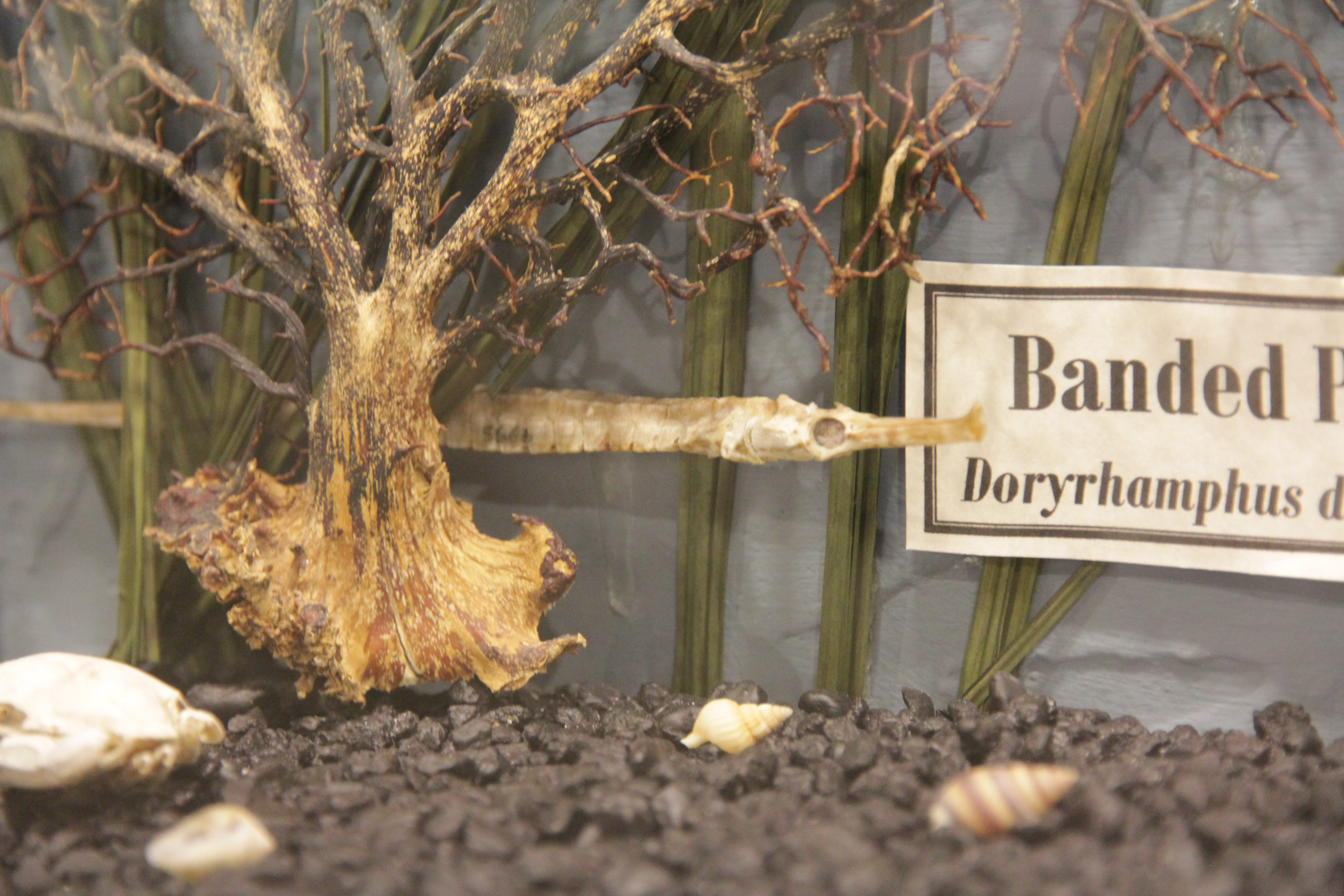
Skeleton of a banded pipefish (Museum of Osteology)

== Reproduction ==
Similar to the other seahorses and pipefishes, the male banded pipefish is equipped with a specialised brood pouch, rather than the female. The female deposits her eggs in the male's pouch, where they develop. The male later gives birth.
