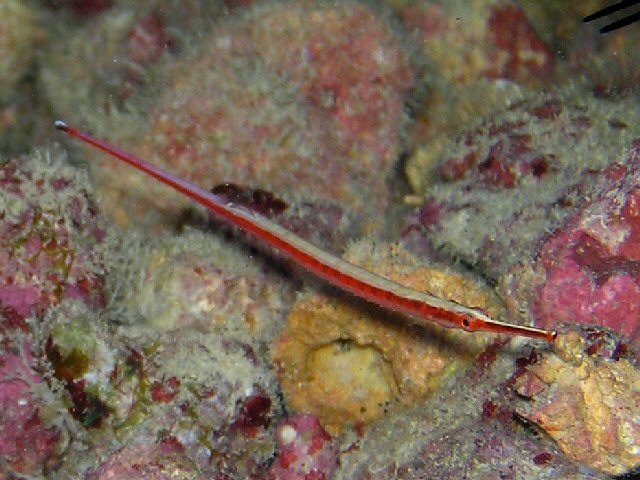

Conservation status
- Least Concern (IUCN 3.1)

Scientific classification
- Kingdom: Animalia
- Phylum: Chordata
- Class: Actinopterygii
- Order: Syngnathiformes
- Family: Syngnathidae
- Genus: Dunckerocampus
- Species: D. baldwini

Binomial name
- Dunckerocampus baldwini (Herald & J. E. Randall, 1972)

Synonyms
- Doryrhamphus baldwini (Herald & Randall, 1972)

= Dunckerocampus baldwini =

Redstripe pipefish

Species of fish

The redstripe pipefish (Dunckerocampus baldwini) is a fish from the genus Dunckerocampus.

Dunckerocampus baldwini is found in caves, rocky crevices, and the seaward slopes of coral reefs and it is an active cleaner which has been recorded cleaning small parasitic crustaceans on cave cardinal fish (Zapogon evermanni) and a moray eel (Gymnothorax sp.). It has also been reported associating with iridescent cardinalfish (Pristiapogon kallopterus) and Hawaiian squirrelfish (Sargocentron xantherythrum) It is an ovoviviparous species, in which the males brood fertilised eggs in a pouch beneath their trunk before giving live birth. The brood size can be as large as 200 embryos. They reach a maximum size of 15 centimetres (5.9 in), and males begin brooding at 10.7 centimetres (4.2 in). It has been recorded from Hawaii, and was thought to be endemic to that archipelago, it has since been recorded in West Papua and off Christmas Island but which island this refers to is uncertain, as there is an island, Kiritimati, sometimes called Christmas Island in Kiribati, as well as one in the eastern Indian Ocean.
