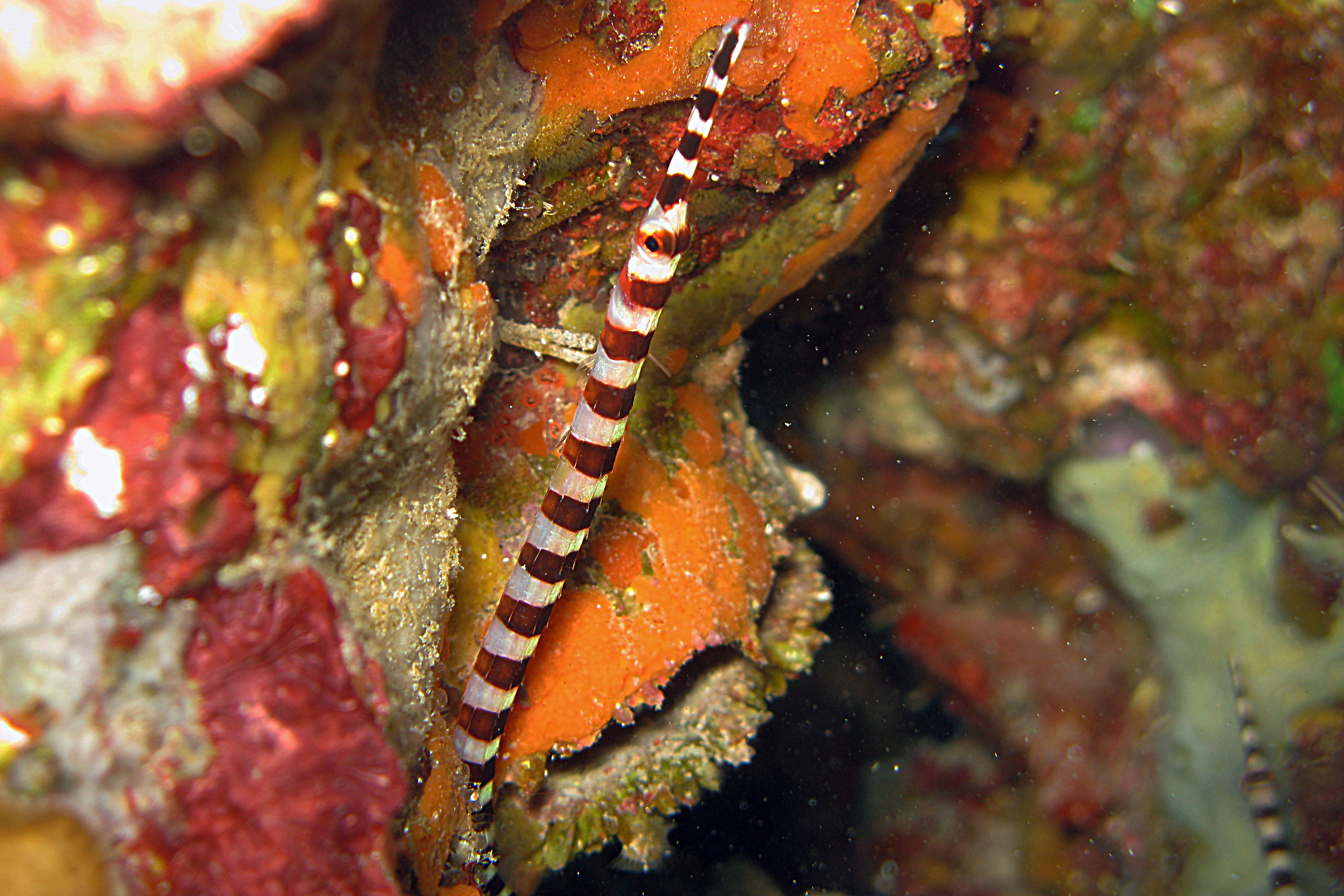

Conservation status
- Least Concern (IUCN 3.1)

Scientific classification
- Kingdom: Animalia
- Phylum: Chordata
- Class: Actinopterygii
- Order: Syngnathiformes
- Family: Syngnathidae
- Genus: Dunckerocampus
- Species: D. boylei

Binomial name
- Dunckerocampus boylei Kuiter, 1998

= Dunckerocampus boylei =

Broad-banded pipefish

Species of fish

Dunckerocampus boylei (broad-banded pipefish) is a species of marine fish of the family Syngnathidae. It is found in the Red Sea, Mauritius, and Indonesia, but it is thought to be widespread throughout the Indian Ocean. It lives in coastal caves and crevices at depths of 20–40 metres (66–131 ft), where it can grow to lengths of 16 centimetres (6.3 in). It feeds on small crustaceans that grow on other fish species. This species is ovoviviparous, with males carrying eggs and giving birth to live young. The specific name honours Bill Boyle, an underwater fish photographer who drew the attention of Kuiter to the species.
