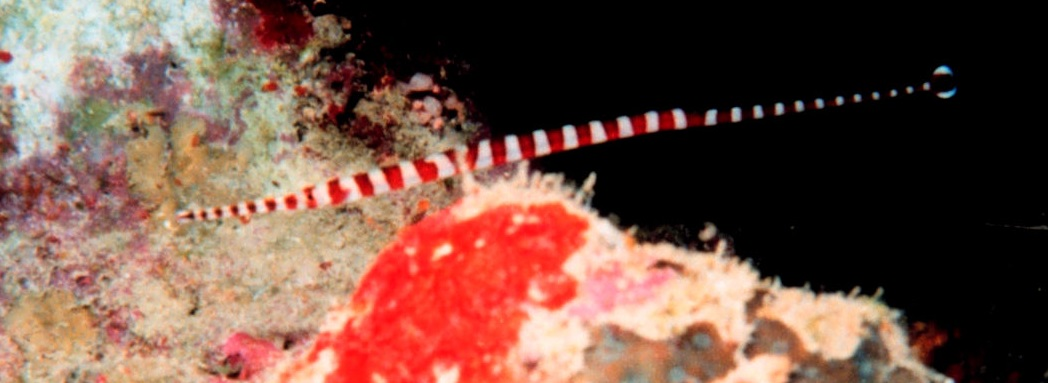

Conservation status
- Least Concern (IUCN 3.1)

Scientific classification
- Kingdom: Animalia
- Phylum: Chordata
- Class: Actinopterygii
- Order: Syngnathiformes
- Family: Syngnathidae
- Genus: Dunckerocampus
- Species: D. multiannulatus

Binomial name
- Dunckerocampus multiannulatus Regan, 1903

Synonyms
- Doryichthys multiannulatus Regan, 1903; Dunckerocampus bentuviae Fowler & Steinitz, 1956

= Dunckerocampus multiannulatus =

Many-banded pipefish

Species of fish

Dunckerocampus multiannulatus (many-banded pipefish) is a species of marine fish of the family Syngnathidae. It is widespread in the Indian Ocean, from the Red Sea and South Africa to the Andaman Islands and Sumatra, Indonesia. It inhabits coral and rocky reefs to depths of 45 metres (148 ft), where it can grow to lengths of 18 centimetres (7.1 in). It is an active cleaner, feeding on small crustaceans that grow on other fishes. This species is ovoviviparous, with males carrying eggs and giving birth to live young. Males may brood at 13 centimetres (5.1 in).
