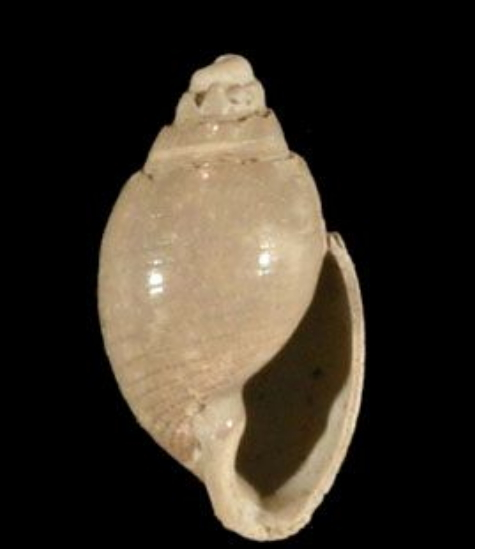
- Shell of † Acteon laevigatus (specimen at the Natural History Museum, Rotterdam)

Scientific classification
- Kingdom: Animalia
- Phylum: Mollusca
- Class: Gastropoda
- Superfamily: Acteonoidea
- Family: Acteonidae
- Genus: Acteon
- Species: †A. laevigatus

Binomial name
- †Acteon laevigatus (Grateloup, 1828)

Synonyms
- † Tornatella laevigata Grateloup, 1828

= Acteon laevigatus =

Extinct species of gastropods

Acteon laevigatus is an extinct species of sea snail, a marine gastropod mollusc in the family Acteonidae.

== Description ==
The length of the shell attains 4 mm.

== Distribution ==
Fossils of this marine species have been found in Miocene strata near Werder, Lower Saxony, Germany and in Gelderland, the Netherlands.
