= Dunckerocampus naia =

Naia pipefish

Conservation status
- Least Concern (IUCN 3.1)

Scientific classification
- Kingdom: Animalia
- Phylum: Chordata
- Class: Actinopterygii
- Order: Syngnathiformes
- Family: Syngnathidae
- Genus: Dunckerocampus
- Species: D. naia

Binomial name
- Dunckerocampus naia Allen & Kuiter, 2004

Species of fish

Dunckerocampus naia (Naia pipefish) is thought to be a species of marine fish of the family Syngnathidae, although further taxonomic study is needed to determine if the classification is valid or if this species is synonymous with D. dactyliophorus. It is found in the Pacific Ocean, off of Japan, Guam, Indonesia, Fiji, and the Solomon Islands. It lives in caverns or under ledges amongst rocky or coral reefs at depths of 15–40 metres (49–131 ft), where it can grow to lengths of 12 centimetres (4.7 in). It is expected to feed on small crustaceans. This species is ovoviviparous, with males carrying eggs and giving birth to live young.

== Identifying Features ==
D. naia can be identified by its colour pattern of 24–31 alternating pale yellow and maroon bars. Its tail fin in mostly red, with broad white upper and lower margins.
