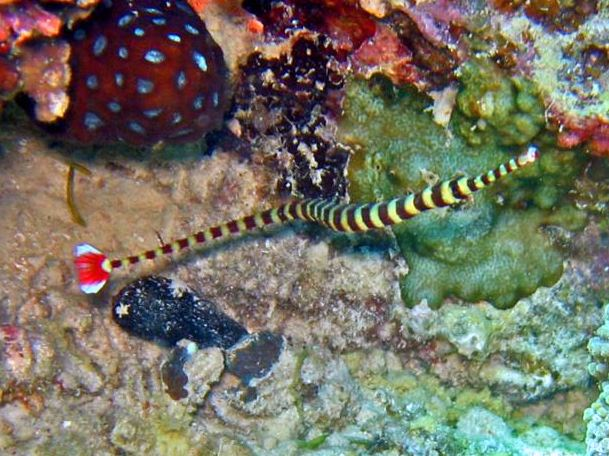
- Ringed Pipefish (D. dactyliophorus)
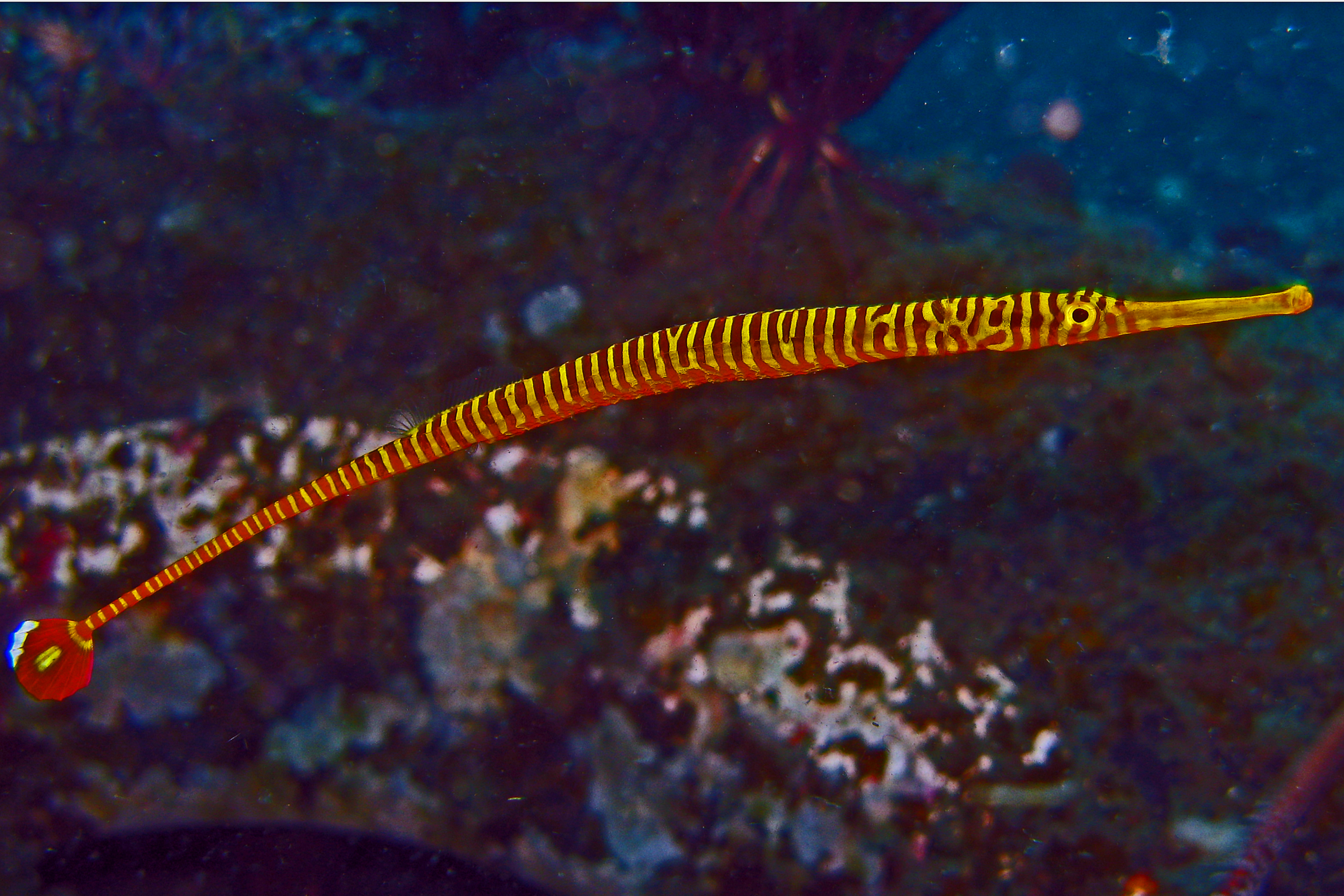
- Yellow-banded Pipefish (D. pessuliferus)

Scientific classification
- Domain: Eukaryota
- Kingdom: Animalia
- Phylum: Chordata
- Class: Actinopterygii
- Order: Syngnathiformes
- Family: Syngnathidae
- Subfamily: Syngnathinae
- Genus: Dunckerocampus; Whitley, 1933

Type species
- Syngnathus dactyliophorus Bleeker, 1853

= Dunckerocampus =

Genus of fishes

Dunckerocampus is a genus of pipefishes one of two genera known as the flagtail pipefishes. This genus is native to the Indian and Pacific Oceans where they are usually found in reef environments. These species are elongated and have a maximum length between 10 and 20 centimetres (3.9 and 7.9 in), with D. chapmani being the only species with a maximum length below 15 centimetres (5.9 in). Their tail is red with a whitish edge, and in some species there is a white or yellow spot in the center. All except D. baldwini have vertical red/brown and yellow/white stripes on their body.

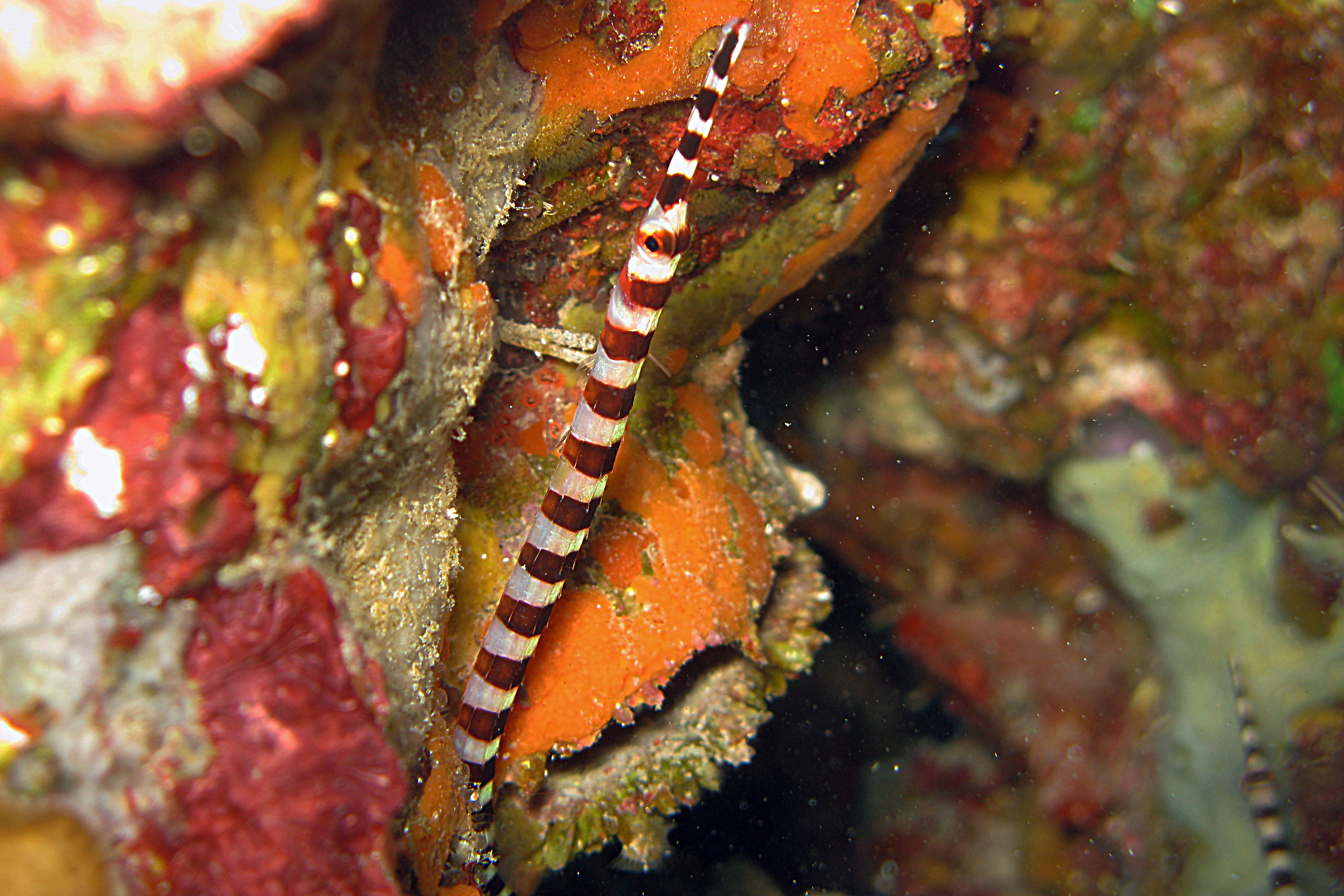
Broad-banded Pipefish (D. boylei)

== Species ==
There are currently seven recognized species in this genus:

- Dunckerocampus baldwini Herald & J. E. Randall, 1972 (Redstripe pipefish)
- Dunckerocampus boylei Kuiter, 1998 (Broad-banded Pipefish)
- Dunckerocampus chapmani Herald, 1953 (Glowtail pipefish)
- Dunckerocampus dactyliophorus (Bleeker, 1853) (Ringed pipefish)
- Dunckerocampus multiannulatus (Regan, 1903) (Many-banded pipefish)
- Dunckerocampus naia G. R. Allen & Kuiter, 2004
- Dunckerocampus pessuliferus Fowler, 1938 (Yellowbanded pipefish)
