= Dunckerocampus chapmani =

Glowtail pipefish

Conservation status
- Data Deficient (IUCN 3.1)

Scientific classification
- Kingdom: Animalia
- Phylum: Chordata
- Class: Actinopterygii
- Order: Syngnathiformes
- Family: Syngnathidae
- Genus: Dunckerocampus
- Species: D. chapmani

Binomial name
- Dunckerocampus chapmani Herald, 1953

Synonyms
- Dunckerocampus caulleryi subsp. chapmani Herald, 1953

Species of fish

Dunckerocampus chapmani (glowtail pipefish, or New Caledonian pipefish) is a species of marine fish of the family Syngnathidae. It is endemic to New Caledonia, where it inhabits shallow lagoons to depths of 0–8 metres (0–26 ft) (although more commonly found at 0–3 metres (0.0–9.8 ft)). It has only been recorded in the vicinity of the city of Noumea. It can grow to lengths of 8.5 centimetres (3.3 in). It is expected to feed on small parasitic crustaceans that grow on other fishes, similar to most other members of its genus. This species is ovoviviparous, with males carrying eggs and giving birth to live young. The eggs of D. chapmani are particularly large, meaning that only 30 per brood are produced, which is quite low for a pipefish. Males may brood at 8 centimetres (3.1 in).
