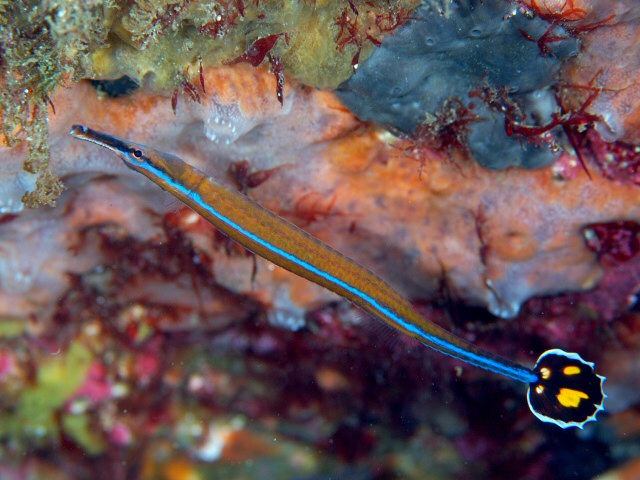
- D. japonicus

Scientific classification
- Domain: Eukaryota
- Kingdom: Animalia
- Phylum: Chordata
- Class: Actinopterygii
- Order: Syngnathiformes
- Family: Syngnathidae
- Subfamily: Syngnathinae
- Genus: Doryrhamphus; Kaup, 1856

Type species
- Doryrhamphus excisus Kaup, 1856

Synonyms
- Acanthognathus Duncker, 1912; Dentirostrum Herald & Randall, 1972; Pristidoryrhamphus Fowler, 1944

= Doryrhamphus =

Genus of fishes

Doryrhamphus is a genus of pipefishes, one of the two genera colloquially known as flagtail pipefishes and are popular in the aquarium trade. The members of this genus are native to the Indian and Pacific Oceans where they inhabit reef environments. The species in this genus have a maximum length of 14 centimetres (5.5 in) or less, with D. janssi being the only species that surpasses 8.5 centimetres (3.3 in). Most species have a horizontal blue line along their body, and all have a whitish-edged tail that is marked contrastingly with black, red or yellow.

== Species ==
There are currently six recognized species in this genus:

- Doryrhamphus aurolineatus J. E. Randall & Earle, 1994
- Doryrhamphus bicarinatus C. E. Dawson, 1981 (Narrowstripe pipefish)

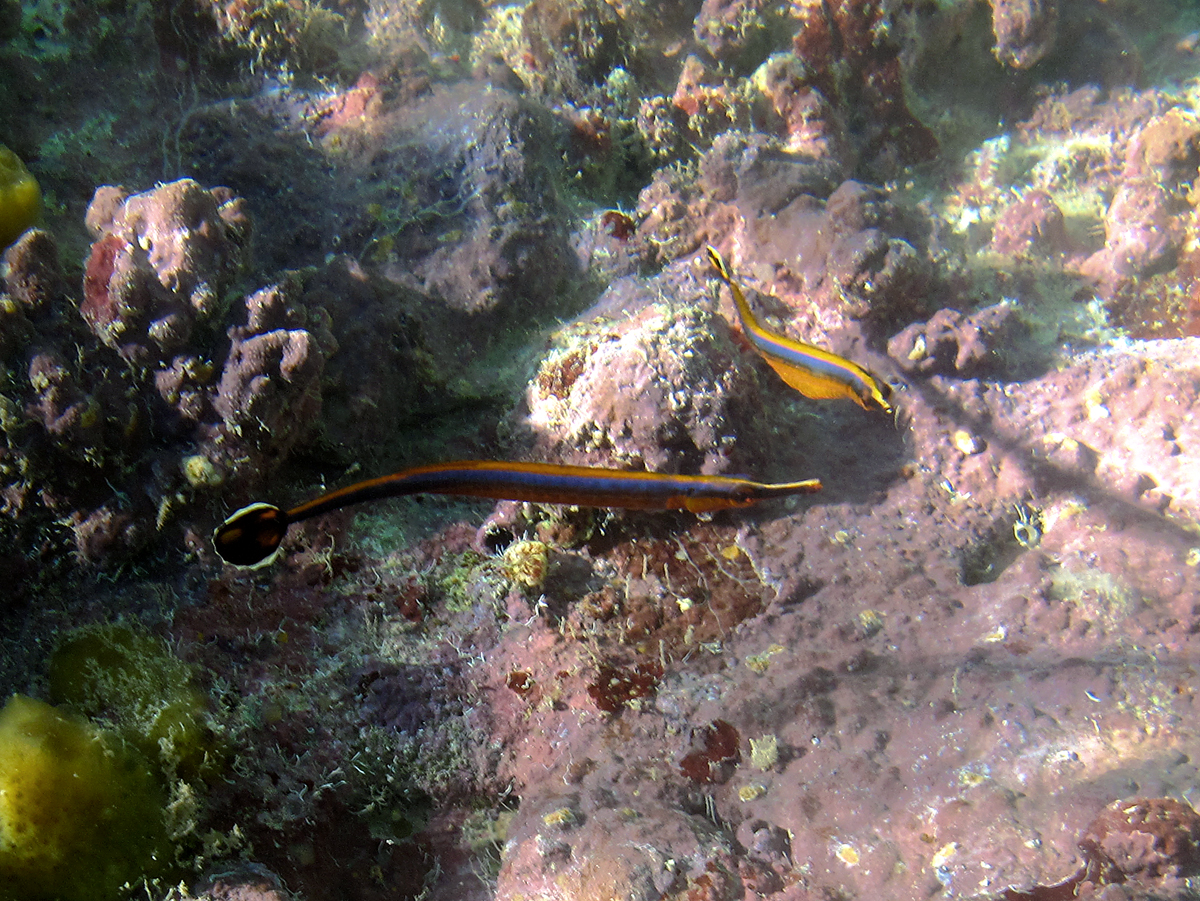
A narrowstripe pipefish (Doryrhamphus bicarinatus).

- Doryrhamphus excisus Kaup, 1856
  - Doryrhamphus excisus abbreviatus C. E. Dawson, 1981
  - Doryrhamphus excisus excisus Kaup, 1856 (Bluestripe pipefish)
- Doryrhamphus janssi (Herald & J. E. Randall, 1972) (Janss' pipefish)
- Doryrhamphus japonicus Araga & Yoshino, 1975
- Doryrhamphus negrosensis Herre, 1934
  - Doryrhamphus negrosensis malus (Whitley, 1954) (Masthead Island pipefish)
  - Doryrhamphus negrosensis negrosensis Herre, 1934 (Negros pipefish)
