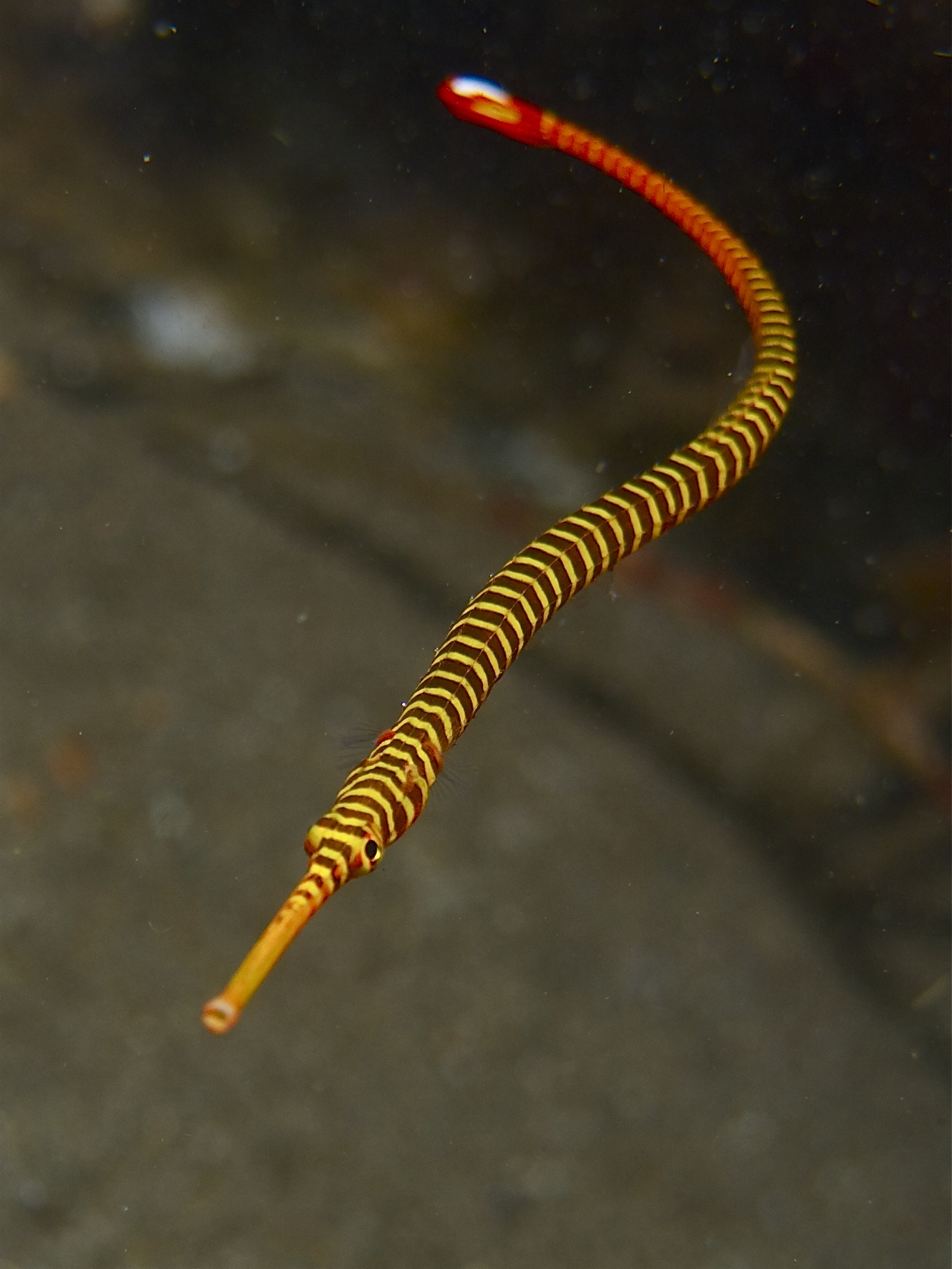

Conservation status
- Least Concern (IUCN 3.1)

Scientific classification
- Kingdom: Animalia
- Phylum: Chordata
- Class: Actinopterygii
- Order: Syngnathiformes
- Family: Syngnathidae
- Genus: Dunckerocampus
- Species: D. pessuliferus

Binomial name
- Dunckerocampus pessuliferus Fowler, 1938

Synonyms
- Doryrhamphus pessuliferus (Fowler, 1938)

= Dunckerocampus pessuliferus =

Yellowbanded pipefish

Species of fish

Dunckerocampus pessuliferus (yellowbanded pipefish), occasionally Doryrhamphus pessuliferus, is a species of marine fish of the family Syngnathidae. It is a coastal species, inhabiting waters around the Coral Triangle, including the Philippines, Indonesia, and northwestern Australia. It lives in coral patches on sandy and muddy slopes at depths of 15–44 metres (49–144 ft), where it can grow to lengths of 16 centimetres (6.3 in). It is an active cleaner, feeding off of parasitic crustaceans growing on other fishes. The adult fish form pairs and are normally observed swimming along the bottom around large remote coral heads on muddy slopes. This species is ovoviviparous, with males carrying eggs and giving birth to live young.

It occasionally makes its way into the aquarium trade, but is protected in Australia under the Environment Protection and Biodiversity Conservation Act 1999.

== Identifying features ==
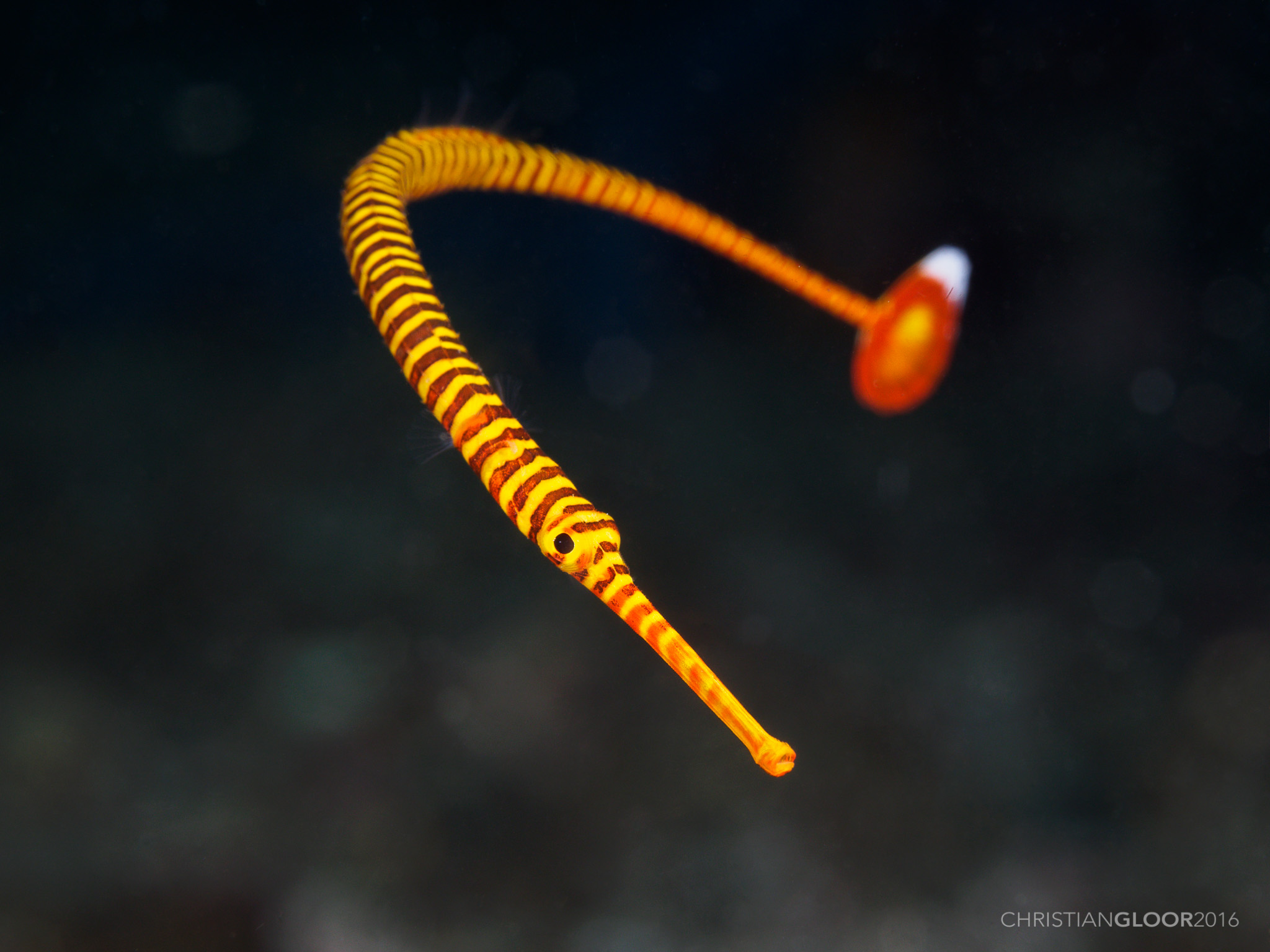
Dunckerocampus pessuliferus at Wakatobi National Park, 2016

The head and body of D. pessuliferus have alternating reddish-brown and yellow bands, while the tail is mostly red with a yellow spot in the center and marginal white markings.
