= Walter Wolfgang Kempf =

German entomologist (1920–1976)

Walter Wolfgang Kempf (26 March 1920 – 20 August 1976) was a German-Brazilian Franciscan priest and an entomologist who specialized on the ants of South America.

Kempf was born in Speyer from where his father had been forced by the National Socialist Party in 1935 to emigrate to Brazil, Rolandia (Parana). Kempf worked on the family estate and then went to join the Franciscan Order in Rio Negro around 1936 and after training at Curitiba and Petropolis, he was ordained priest in 1945. He was interested in ethnology and collected material on the mythology of indigenous people. After meeting Thomas Borgmeier at Petropolis in 1944 he realized that he could conduct entomological studies. He began to collect and examine ants in his laboratory in Rio de Janeiro. He went to study entomology at Siena College, New York and received a bachelor's degree in 1948 and was sponsored for a PhD at Cornell University where he worked on the ant tribe Cephalotini under the supervision of V.S.L. Pate. He returned to continue his entomological studies. Along with Borgmeier, he founded the journal Studia Entomologica. He became a visiting professor at the University of Brasilia in 1975. He died from a heart attack while in Washington DC attending the International Entomological Congress in August, 1976 on the night before he was due to present a paper on the ants of the São Paulo State. He was buried at São Paulo.
