= A. brevicollis =

A. brevicollis may refer to:

- Abacetus brevicollis, a ground beetle
- Acinopus brevicollis, a ground beetle
- Acropora brevicollis, a synonym of Acropora digitifera, a coral
- Aechmea brevicollis, a plant found in South America
- Aedoeus brevicollis, a longhorn beetle
- Amara brevicollis, a ground beetle
- Amphionthe brevicollis, a longhorn beetle
- Anomalopus brevicollis, a synonym of Praeteropus brevicollis, a skink found in Australia
