= A. ambiguus =

A. ambiguus may refer to:

- Abacetus ambiguus, a West African ground beetle
- Acinopus ambiguus, a ground beetle
- Acromyrmex ambiguus, a South American ant
- Agabus ambiguus, a North American diving beetle
- Amphientulus ambiguus, an Australian proturan
- Angomonas ambiguus, a parasitic protist
- Anochetus ambiguus, a prehistoric ant
- Ara ambiguus, the great green macaw, a Central and South American parrot
- Aspergillus ambiguus, a fungus
- Aster ambiguus, a synonym of Eurybia macrophylla, a North American plant
- Atrypanius ambiguus, a South American longhorn beetle
