= A. dejeani =

A. dejeani may refer to:

- Abacetus dejeani, a ground beetle
- Amphionthe dejeani, a longhorn beetle
- Anisocerus dejeani, a longhorn beetle
- Arctia dejeani, a moth found in Europe
- Ateralphus dejeani, a longhorn beetle
