= A. infimus =

A. infimus may refer to:

- Abacetus infimus, a ground beetle
- Atrypanius infimus, a longhorn beetle
