= A. antoinei =

A. antoinei may refer to:

- Abacetus antoinei, a ground beetle found in Morocco
- Acinopus antoinei, a ground beetle
- Andrena antoinei, a prehistoric mining bee
