= A. glandulosa =

A. glandulosa may refer to:

- Aechmea glandulosa, a plant species endemic to Brazil
- Alchornea glandulosa, a tree species native to South America
- Ansonia glandulosa, a toad species endemic to Indonesia
- Archidendropsis glandulosa, a legume species found only in New Caledonia
- Arbutus glandulosa, a plant species found in Guatemala and Mexico
- Arctostaphylos glandulosa, the Eastwood's manzanita, a shrub species native to the coastal slopes of western North America from Oregon to Baja California
