= A. carvalhoi =

A. carvalhoi may refer to:

- Aechmea carvalhoi, a bromeliaceae species endemic to Brazil
- Amphisbaena carvalhoi, a worm lizard species found in Brazil

== See also ==
- Carvalhoi (disambiguation)
