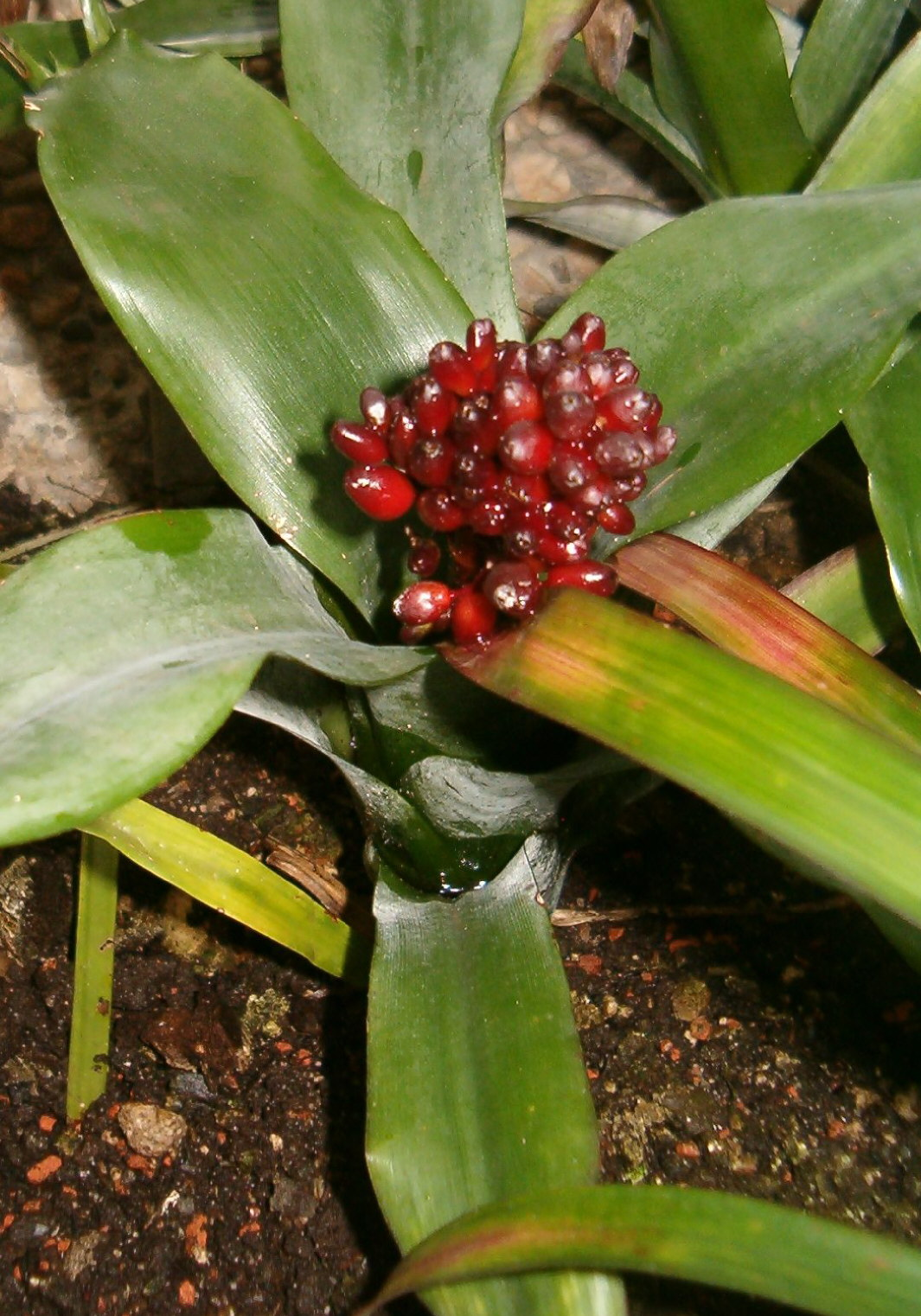

Scientific classification
- Kingdom: Plantae
- Clade: Tracheophytes
- Clade: Angiosperms
- Clade: Monocots
- Clade: Commelinids
- Order: Poales
- Family: Bromeliaceae
- Genus: Aechmea
- Subgenus: Aechmea subg. Lamprococcus
- Species: A. farinosa

Binomial name
- Aechmea farinosa (Regel) L.B.Sm.

Synonyms
- Lamprococcus farinosus Regel; Aechmea conglomerata var. farinosa (Regel) Baker; Aechmea glomerata var. farinosa (Regel) Mez; Lamprococcus glomeratus Beer; Lamprococcus glomeratus var. discolor Beer; Aechmea conglomerata Baker; Aechmea glomerata (Beer) Mez 1892, not Hook. f. 1867

= Aechmea farinosa =

Species of flowering plant

Aechmea farinosa is a plant species in the genus Aechmea. This species is endemic to the State of Bahia in eastern Brazil.

== History ==
Eduard August von Regel (German gardener and botanist) published the original description of Aechmea farinosa and gave it legal publication. However, Lyman Bradford Smith (American botanist) changed and reclassified the species in 1966.
