= Atrypanius haldemani =

Scientific classification
- Kingdom: Animalia
- Phylum: Arthropoda
- Class: Insecta
- Order: Coleoptera
- Suborder: Polyphaga
- Infraorder: Cucujiformia
- Family: Cerambycidae
- Genus: Atrypanius
- Species: A. haldemani

Binomial name
- Atrypanius haldemani (LeConte, 1852)

Species of beetle

Atrypanius haldemani is a species of beetle in the family Cerambycidae. It was described by John Lawrence LeConte in 1852.
