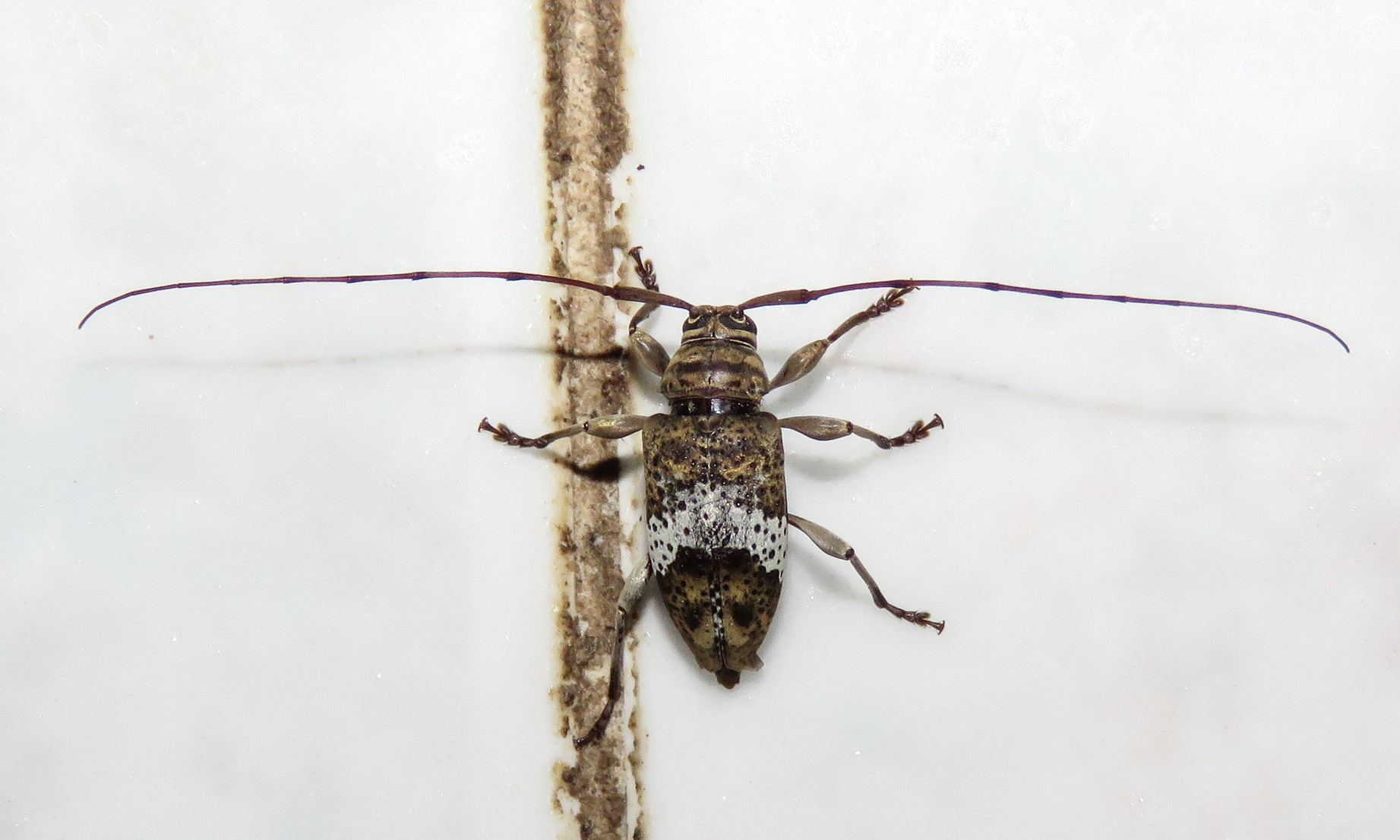

Scientific classification
- Kingdom: Animalia
- Phylum: Arthropoda
- Class: Insecta
- Order: Coleoptera
- Suborder: Polyphaga
- Infraorder: Cucujiformia
- Family: Cerambycidae
- Genus: Atrypanius
- Species: A. albocinctus

Binomial name
- Atrypanius albocinctus Melzer, 1930

= Atrypanius albocinctus =

Species of beetle

Atrypanius albocinctus is a species of longhorn beetle in the subfamily Lamiinae. It was described by Melzer in 1930, and is known from south-eastern Brazil, Paraguay, and Argentina.
