= Acinopus brittoni =

Scientific classification
- Kingdom: Animalia
- Phylum: Arthropoda
- Clade: Pancrustacea
- Class: Insecta
- Order: Coleoptera
- Suborder: Adephaga
- Family: Carabidae
- Genus: Acinopus
- Species: A. brittoni

Binomial name
- Acinopus brittoni Wrase & Kataev, 2016

Species of beetle

Acinopus brittoni is a species of ground beetle in the subfamily Harpalinae and subgenus Acinopus (Acinopus).
