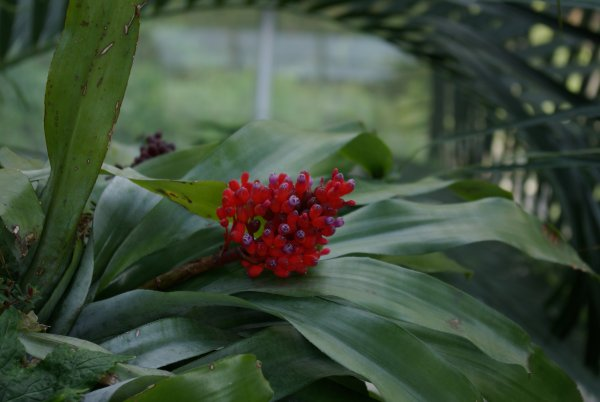

Scientific classification
- Kingdom: Plantae
- Clade: Tracheophytes
- Clade: Angiosperms
- Clade: Monocots
- Clade: Commelinids
- Order: Poales
- Family: Bromeliaceae
- Genus: Aechmea
- Subgenus: Aechmea subg. Lamprococcus
- Species: A. fulgens

Binomial name
- Aechmea fulgens Brongn.

Synonyms
- Lamprococcus fulgens (Brongn.) Beer; Aechmea discolor C.Morren; Lamprococcus fulgens var. discolor (C.Morren) Brongn. ex Beer; Aechmea fulgens var. discolor (C.Morren) Brongn. ex Baker

= Aechmea fulgens =

Species of flowering plant

Aechmea fulgens, the coralberry, is a bromeliad, which is often used as an ornamental plant. This plant grows in Brazil, especially in the following states: Bahia and Pernambuco. It has an upright open rosette shape and after blooming, becomes a reddish orange. It blooms one time before dying.

== Cultivars ==
- Aechmea 'Burning Bush'
- Aechmea 'Festival'
- Aechmea 'Fulgida'
- Aechmea 'Ice-T'
- Aechmea 'Jeanne Eunice'
- Aechmea 'Torch'
