= Amphionthe doris =

Scientific classification
- Domain: Eukaryota
- Kingdom: Animalia
- Phylum: Arthropoda
- Class: Insecta
- Order: Coleoptera
- Suborder: Polyphaga
- Infraorder: Cucujiformia
- Family: Cerambycidae
- Genus: Amphionthe
- Species: A. doris

Binomial name
- Amphionthe doris Bates, 1879

Species of beetle

Amphionthe doris is a species of beetle in the family Cerambycidae. It was described by Henry Walter Bates in 1879.
