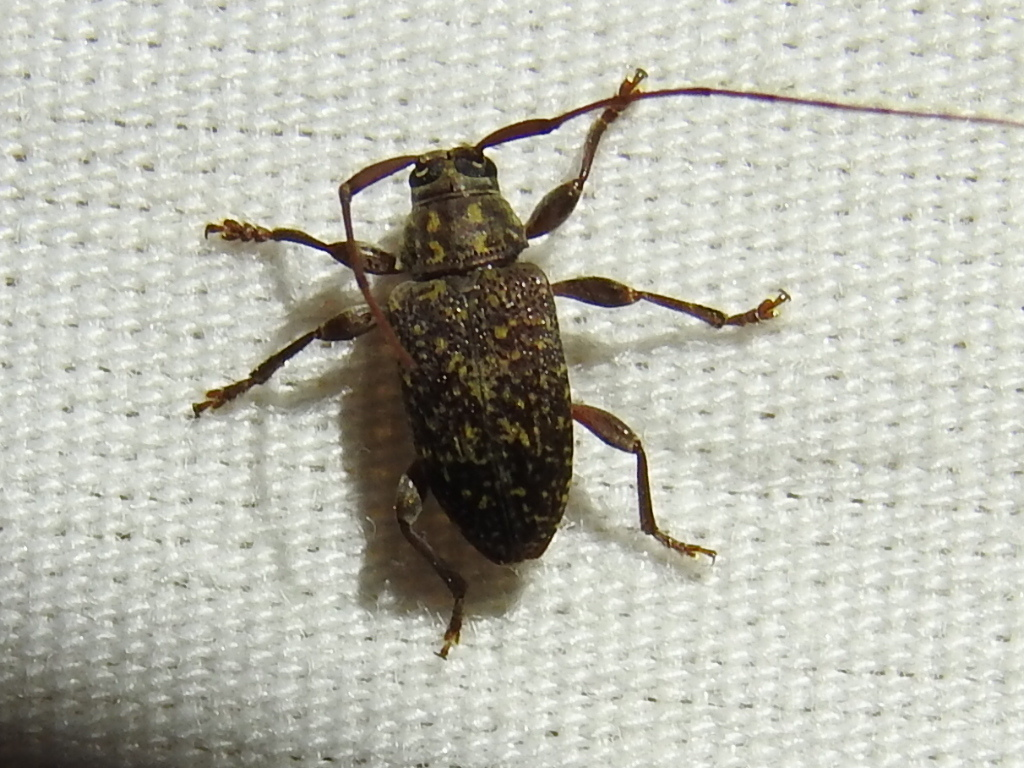

Scientific classification
- Kingdom: Animalia
- Phylum: Arthropoda
- Class: Insecta
- Order: Coleoptera
- Suborder: Polyphaga
- Infraorder: Cucujiformia
- Family: Cerambycidae
- Genus: Atrypanius
- Species: A. irrorellus

Binomial name
- Atrypanius irrorellus Bates, 1885

= Atrypanius irrorellus =

Species of beetle

Atrypanius irrorellus is a species of longhorn beetles of the subfamily Lamiinae. It was described by Henry Walter Bates in 1855, and is known from Mexico to Panama, and Trinidad.
