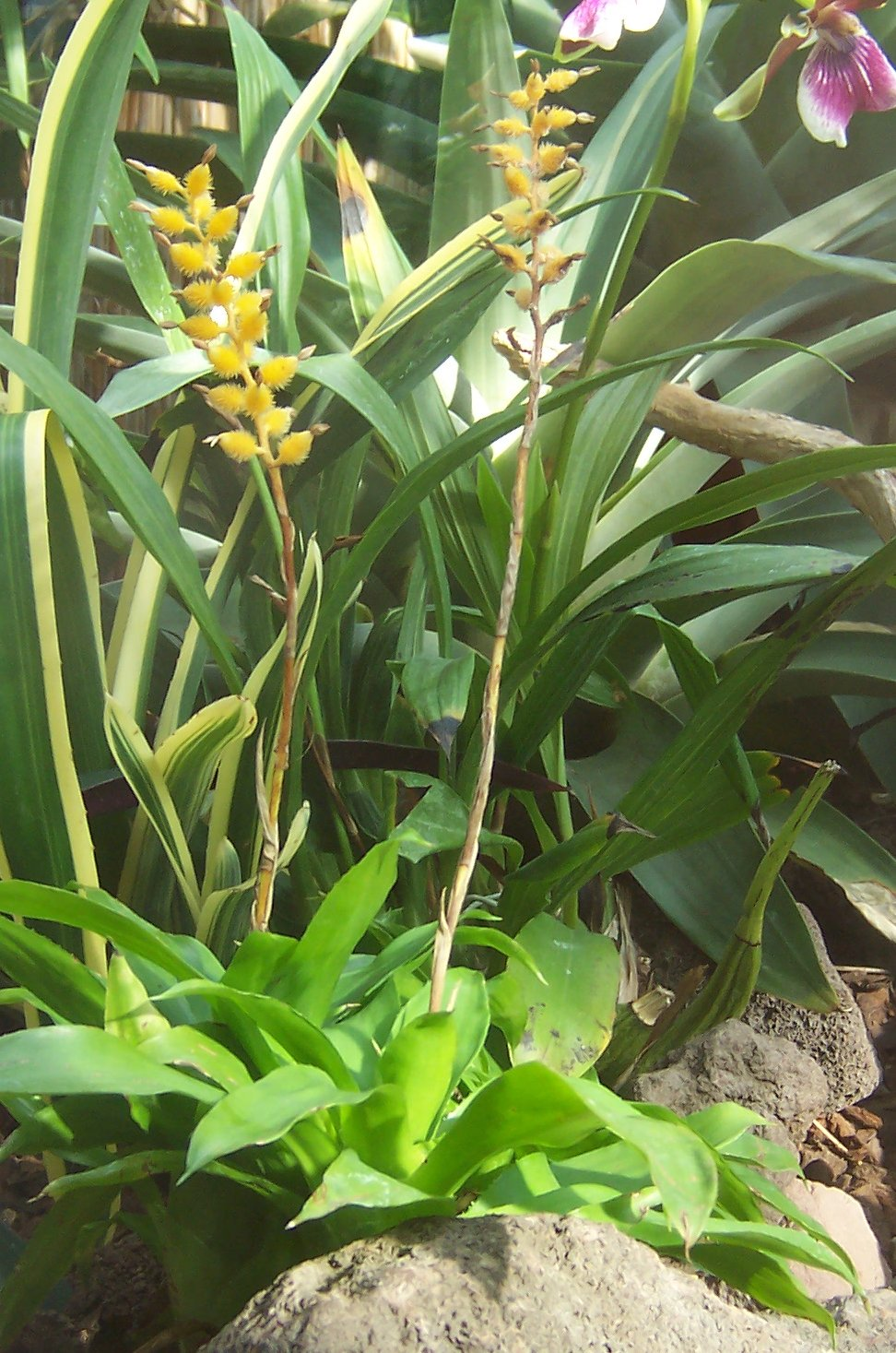

Scientific classification
- Kingdom: Plantae
- Clade: Tracheophytes
- Clade: Angiosperms
- Clade: Monocots
- Clade: Commelinids
- Order: Poales
- Family: Bromeliaceae
- Genus: Aechmea
- Subgenus: Aechmea subg. Lamprococcus
- Species: A. pedicellata

Binomial name
- Aechmea pedicellata Leme & H.Luther

Synonyms
- Lamprococcus pedicellatus (Leme & H.Luther) L.B.Sm. & W.J.Kress

= Aechmea pedicellata =

Species of flowering plant

Aechmea pedicellata is a plant species in the genus Aechmea. This species is endemic to the State of Espírito Santo in eastern Brazil.

== Cultivars ==
- Aechmea 'Nelwyn'
