= Ateralphus =

Scientific classification
- Domain: Eukaryota
- Kingdom: Animalia
- Phylum: Arthropoda
- Class: Insecta
- Order: Coleoptera
- Suborder: Polyphaga
- Infraorder: Cucujiformia
- Family: Cerambycidae
- Tribe: Acanthoderini
- Genus: Ateralphus

Genus of beetles

Ateralphus is a genus of beetles in the family Cerambycidae, containing the following species:

- Ateralphus dejeani (Lane, 1973)
- Ateralphus javariensis (Lane, 1965)
- Ateralphus lacteus Galileo & Martins, 2006
- Ateralphus senilis (Bates, 1862)
- Ateralphus subsellatus (White, 1855)
- Ateralphus variegatus (Mendes, 1938)
