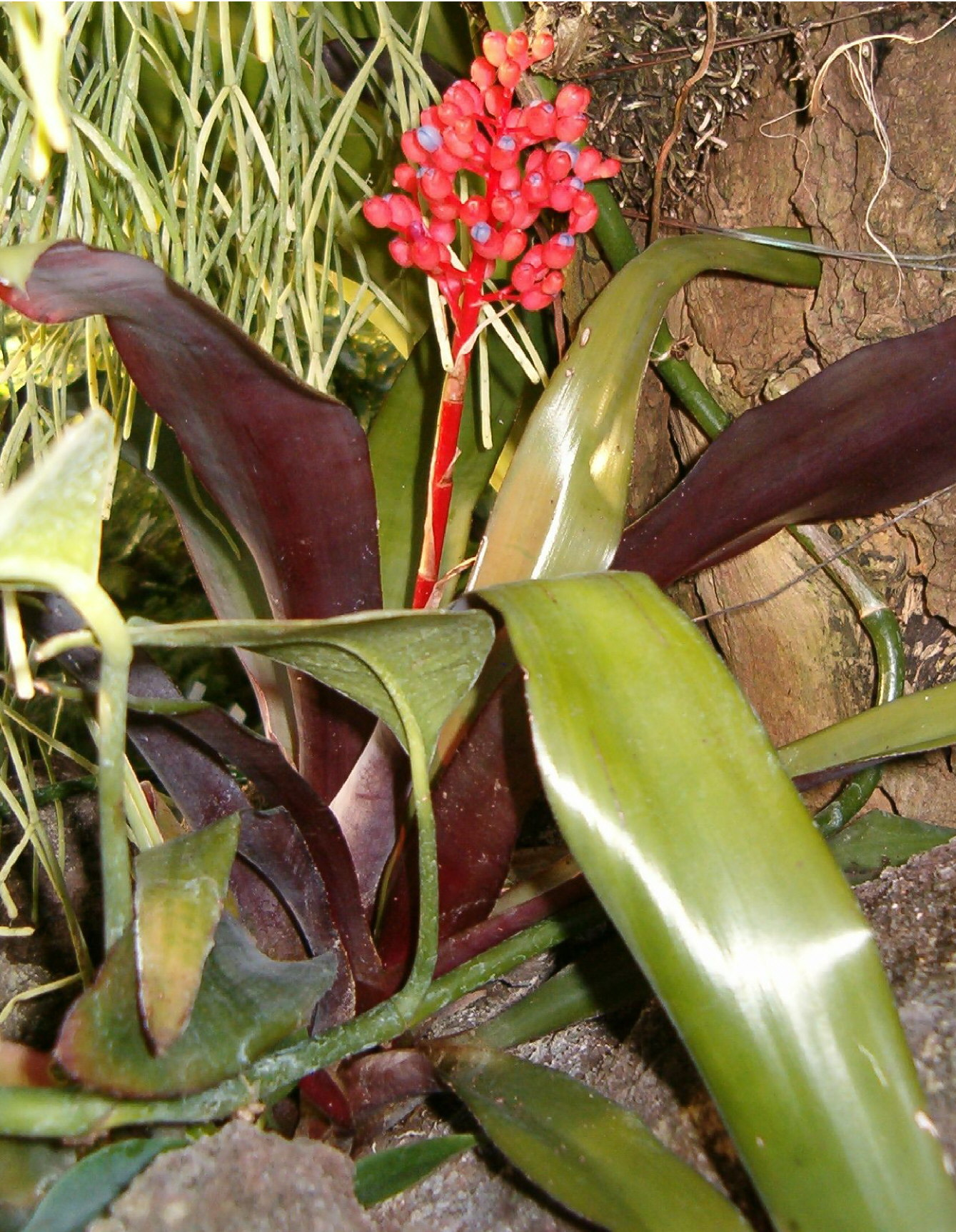

Scientific classification
- Kingdom: Plantae
- Clade: Tracheophytes
- Clade: Angiosperms
- Clade: Monocots
- Clade: Commelinids
- Order: Poales
- Family: Bromeliaceae
- Genus: Aechmea
- Subgenus: Aechmea subg. Lamprococcus
- Species: A. miniata

Binomial name
- Aechmea miniata T.Moore

Synonyms
- Homotypic Synonyms: Lamprococcus miniatus (T.Moore) Beer; Heterotypic Synonyms: Aechmea fulgens var. glomerata Rege; Aechmea miniata var. discolor (Beer) Beer ex Baker; Lamprococcus miniatus var. discolor Beer

= Aechmea miniata =

Species of plant

Aechmea miniata is a species of flowering plant in the family Bromeliaceae. This species is native to the state of Bahia in eastern Brazil.

== Cultivars ==
- Aechmea 'Cherokee Maid'
