= Acinopus subquadratus =

Scientific classification
- Kingdom: Animalia
- Phylum: Arthropoda
- Clade: Pancrustacea
- Class: Insecta
- Order: Coleoptera
- Suborder: Adephaga
- Family: Carabidae
- Genus: Acinopus
- Species: A. subquadratus

Binomial name
- Acinopus subquadratus Brulle, 1832

Species of beetle

Acinopus subquadratus is a species of ground beetle in the subfamily Harpalinae and subgenus Acinopus (Acinopus).
