= Amphionthe =

Scientific classification
- Domain: Eukaryota
- Kingdom: Animalia
- Phylum: Arthropoda
- Class: Insecta
- Order: Coleoptera
- Suborder: Polyphaga
- Infraorder: Cucujiformia
- Family: Cerambycidae
- Subfamily: Cerambycinae
- Tribe: Trachyderini
- Genus: Amphionthe; Bates, 1879

Genus of beetles

Amphionthe is a genus of beetles in the family Cerambycidae, containing the following species:

- Amphionthe brevicollis Bates, 1885
- Amphionthe caudalis Schwarzer, 1929
- Amphionthe chiriquina Achard, 1913
- Amphionthe dejeani Gounelle, 1912
- Amphionthe doris Bates, 1879
- Amphionthe oberthuri Achard, 1913
