= Acinopus gutturosus =

Scientific classification
- Kingdom: Animalia
- Phylum: Arthropoda
- Clade: Pancrustacea
- Class: Insecta
- Order: Coleoptera
- Suborder: Adephaga
- Family: Carabidae
- Genus: Acinopus
- Species: A. gutturosus

Binomial name
- Acinopus gutturosus Buquet, 1840

Species of beetle

Acinopus gutturosus

Acinopus gutturosus is a species of ground beetle in the subfamily Harpalinae and the subgenus Acinopus (Oedemalicus).
