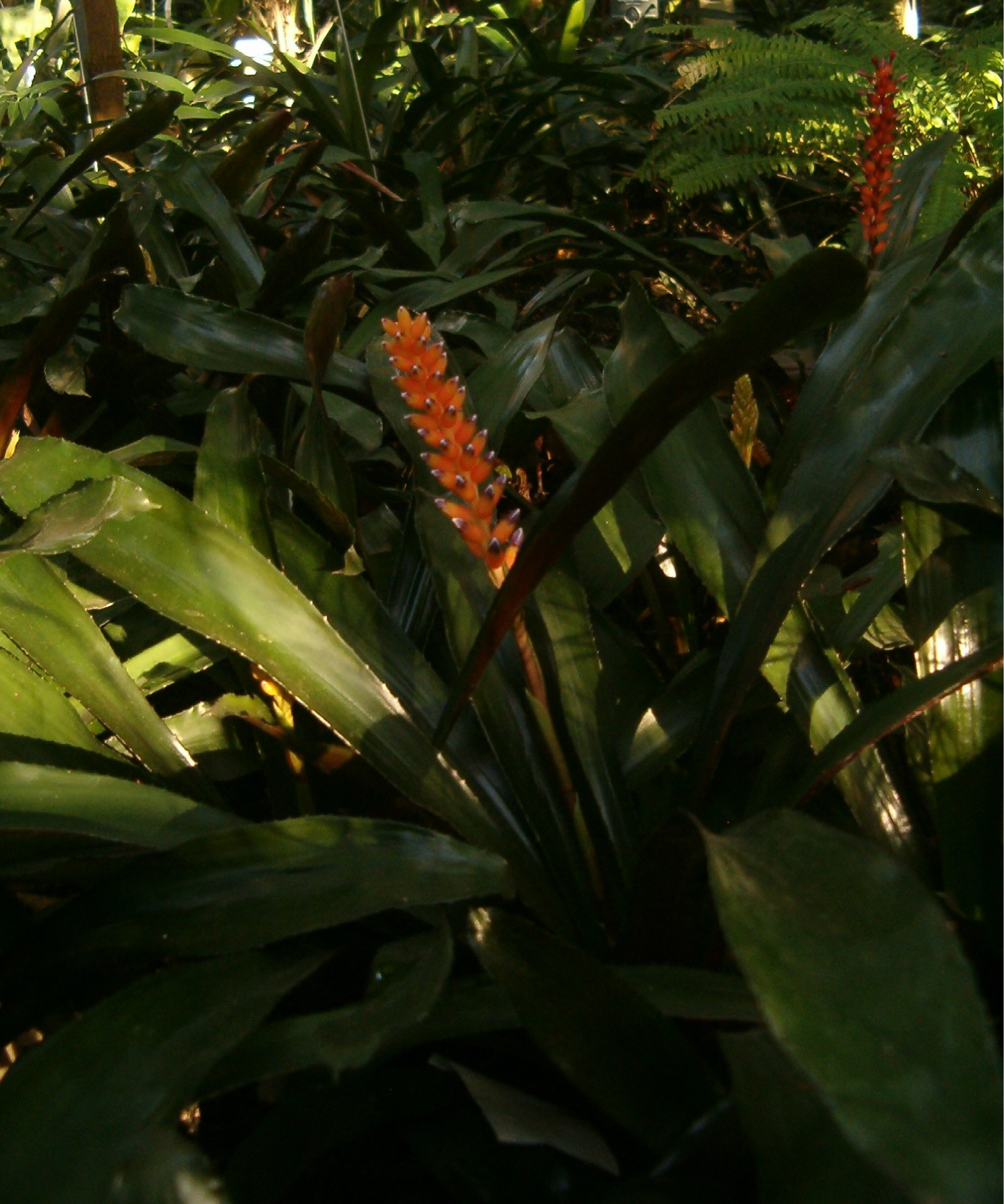

Scientific classification
- Kingdom: Plantae
- Clade: Tracheophytes
- Clade: Angiosperms
- Clade: Monocots
- Clade: Commelinids
- Order: Poales
- Family: Bromeliaceae
- Genus: Aechmea
- Subgenus: Aechmea subg. Lamprococcus
- Species: A. victoriana

Binomial name
- Aechmea victoriana L.B.Sm.

Synonyms
- Lamprococcus victorianus (L.B.Sm.) L.B.Sm. & W.J.Kress; Aechmea capixabae L.B.Sm.; Aechmea victoriana var. discolor M.B.Foster; Lamprococcus victorianus var. discolor (M.B.Foster) L.B.Sm. & W.J.Kress

= Aechmea victoriana =

Species of flowering plant

Aechmea victoriana is a plant species in the genus Aechmea.

This bromeliad is endemic to the State of Espírito Santo and to the Atlantic Forest biome (Mata Atlantica Brasileira), located in southeastern Brazil.

== Cultivars ==
- Aechmea 'Cherokee Maid'
