= Aechmea corymbosa =

Scientific classification
- Kingdom: Plantae
- Clade: Tracheophytes
- Clade: Angiosperms
- Clade: Monocots
- Clade: Commelinids
- Order: Poales
- Family: Bromeliaceae
- Genus: Aechmea
- Subgenus: Aechmea subg. Lamprococcus
- Species: A. corymbosa

Binomial name
- Aechmea corymbosa (Martius ex Schultes f.) Mez

Synonyms
- Billbergia corymbosa Mart. ex Schult. & Schult.f.; Billbergia mitis Mart. ex Schult. & Schult.f.; Aechmea mitis (Mart. ex Schult. & Schult.f.) L.B.Sm.

Species of flowering plant

Aechmea corymbosa is a plant species in the genus Aechmea. This species is native to Venezuela, Colombia, Peru, Brazil and Ecuador.
