= Atrypanius scutellatus =

Scientific classification
- Kingdom: Animalia
- Phylum: Arthropoda
- Class: Insecta
- Order: Coleoptera
- Suborder: Polyphaga
- Infraorder: Cucujiformia
- Family: Cerambycidae
- Genus: Atrypanius
- Species: A. scutellatus

Binomial name
- Atrypanius scutellatus (Bates, 1865)

Synonyms
- Nyssodrysina scutellata (Bates, 1866)

Species of beetle

Atrypanius scutellatus is a species of beetle in the family Cerambycidae. It was described by Henry Walter Bates in 1865.
