= Acinopus creticus =

Conservation status
- Data Deficient (IUCN 3.1)

Scientific classification
- Kingdom: Animalia
- Phylum: Arthropoda
- Clade: Pancrustacea
- Class: Insecta
- Order: Coleoptera
- Suborder: Adephaga
- Family: Carabidae
- Genus: Acinopus
- Species: A. creticus

Binomial name
- Acinopus creticus Maran, 1947

Species of beetle

Acinopus creticus is a species of ground beetle in the subfamily Harpalinae and subgenus Acinopus (Acinopus).
