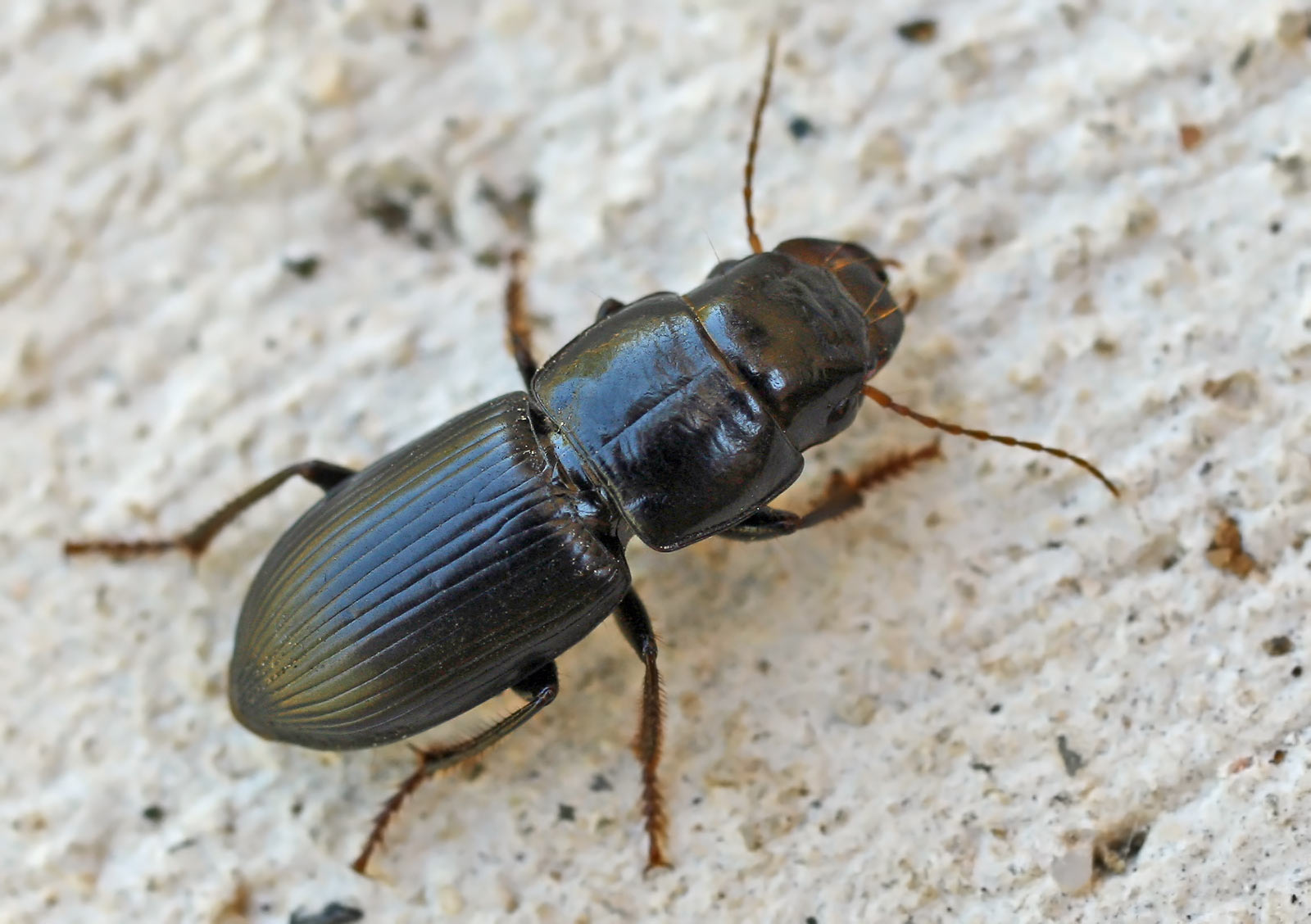

Scientific classification
- Domain: Eukaryota
- Kingdom: Animalia
- Phylum: Arthropoda
- Class: Insecta
- Order: Coleoptera
- Suborder: Adephaga
- Family: Carabidae
- Subfamily: Harpalinae
- Tribe: Harpalini
- Subtribe: Harpalina
- Genus: Acinopus; Dejean, 1821

= Acinopus =

Genus of beetles

Acinopus is a genus of beetles in the family Carabidae, containing the following species:

- Acinopus almeriensis Mateu, 1954
- Acinopus ambiguus Dejean, 1829
- Acinopus ammophilus Dejean, 1829
- Acinopus antoinei Puel, 1934
- Acinopus arabicus Wrase & Kataev, 2016
- Acinopus baudii A. Fiori, 1913
- Acinopus boiteli Alluaud, 1930
- Acinopus brevicollis Baudi Di Selva, 1882
- Acinopus brittoni Wrase & Kataev, 2016
- Acinopus creticus Maran, 1947
- Acinopus dianae Schatzmayr, 1943
- Acinopus doderoi Gudelli, 1925
- Acinopus giganteus Dejean, 1831
- Acinopus grassator Coquerel, 1859
- Acinopus gutturosus Buquet, 1840
- Acinopus haroldii Schaum, 1863
- Acinopus jeannei J. Vives & E. Vives, 1989
- Acinopus khalisensis Ali, 1967
- Acinopus labiatus (Erichson, 1843)
- Acinopus laevigatus Menetries, 1832
- Acinopus laevipennis Fairmaire, 1859
- Acinopus lepeletieri Lucas, 1846
- Acinopus liouvillei Puel, 1934
- Acinopus megacephalus P. Rossi, 1794
- Acinopus orszuliki Wrase & Kataev, 2016
- Acinopus picipes (Olivier, 1795)
- Acinopus pilipes Piochard De La Brulerie, 1868
- Acinopus pueli Schatzmayr, 1935
- Acinopus sabulosus Fabricius, 1792
- Acinopus sinaiticus Wrase & Kataev, 2016
- Acinopus striolatus Zoubkoff, 1833
- Acinopus subquadratus Brulle, 1832
