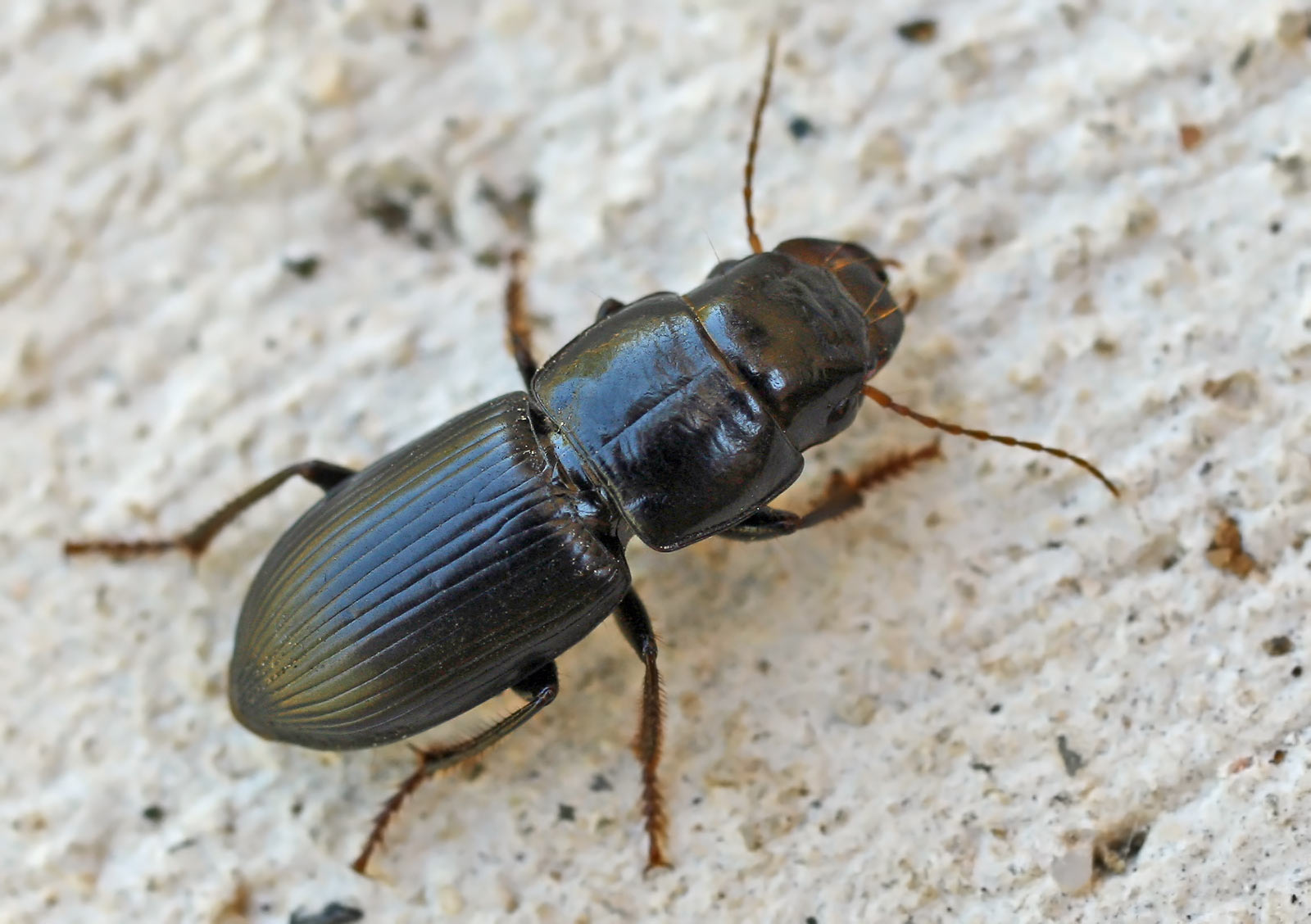

Scientific classification
- Kingdom: Animalia
- Phylum: Arthropoda
- Clade: Pancrustacea
- Class: Insecta
- Order: Coleoptera
- Suborder: Adephaga
- Family: Carabidae
- Genus: Acinopus
- Species: A. picipes

Binomial name
- Acinopus picipes Olivier, 1795

= Acinopus picipes =

Species of beetle

Acinopus picipes is a species of ground beetle in the subfamily Harpalinae and subgenus Acinopus (Acinopus).
