= Atrypanius heyrovskyi =

Scientific classification
- Kingdom: Animalia
- Phylum: Arthropoda
- Class: Insecta
- Order: Coleoptera
- Suborder: Polyphaga
- Infraorder: Cucujiformia
- Family: Cerambycidae
- Genus: Atrypanius
- Species: A. heyrovskyi

Binomial name
- Atrypanius heyrovskyi (Gilmour, 1960)

Synonyms
- Nyssocuneus heyrovskyi

Species of beetle

Atrypanius heyrovskyi is a species of beetle in the family Cerambycidae. It was described by Gilmour in 1960 and named in honour of Leopold Heyrovský
