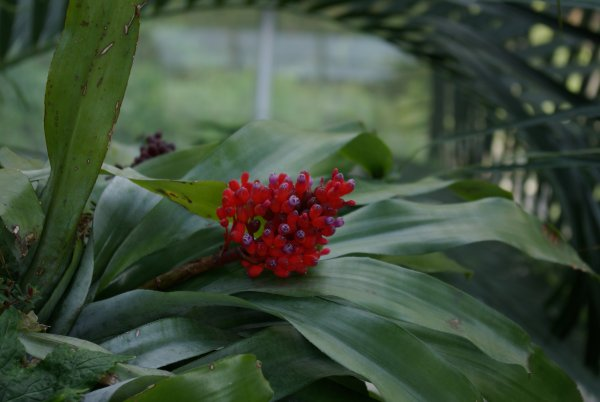

Scientific classification
- Kingdom: Plantae
- Clade: Tracheophytes
- Clade: Angiosperms
- Clade: Monocots
- Clade: Commelinids
- Order: Poales
- Family: Bromeliaceae
- Genus: Aechmea
- Subgenus: Aechmea subg. Lamprococcus (Beer) Baker

Species
- See text

= Aechmea subg. Lamprococcus =

Subgenus of flowering plants

Lamprococcus is a subgenus of the genus Aechmea.

== Species ==
Species accepted by Encyclopedia of Bromeliads as of October 2022:

- Aechmea andersonii H.Luther & Leme
- Aechmea brevicollis L.B.Sm.
- Aechmea campanulata L.B.Sm.
- Aechmea capixabae L.B.Sm.
- Aechmea carvalhoi E.Pereira & Leme
- Aechmea corymbosa (Mart. ex Schult. & Schult.f.) Mez
- Aechmea farinosa (Regel) L.B.Sm.
- Aechmea fulgens Brongn.
- Aechmea glandulosa Leme
- Aechmea miniata (Beer) hort. ex Baker
- Aechmea pedicellata Leme & H.Luther
- Aechmea podantha L.B.Sm.
- Aechmea racinae L.B.Sm.
- Aechmea victoriana L.B.Sm.
- Aechmea warasii E.Pereira
- Aechmea weilbachii F.Didr.
