= Ateralphus subsellatus =

Scientific classification
- Kingdom: Animalia
- Phylum: Arthropoda
- Clade: Pancrustacea
- Class: Insecta
- Order: Coleoptera
- Suborder: Polyphaga
- Infraorder: Cucujiformia
- Family: Cerambycidae
- Genus: Ateralphus
- Species: A. subsellatus

Binomial name
- Ateralphus subsellatus (White, 1855)

Species of beetle

Ateralphus subsellatus is a species of beetle in the family Cerambycidae. It was described by White in 1855. It is found in Brazil (Pernambuco, Paraíba, Bahia, Minas Gerais, Espírito Santo, Rio de Janeiro, São Paulo, Paraná, Santa Catarina, Rio Grande do Sul), Bolivia (Santa Cruz), Paraguay (San Pedro, Central, Alto Paraná) and Argentina (Catamarca, Salta, Tucumán, Misiones).
