= Aechmea andersonii =

Scientific classification
- Kingdom: Plantae
- Clade: Tracheophytes
- Clade: Angiosperms
- Clade: Monocots
- Clade: Commelinids
- Order: Poales
- Family: Bromeliaceae
- Genus: Aechmea
- Subgenus: Aechmea subg. Lamprococcus
- Species: A. andersonii

Binomial name
- Aechmea andersonii H.Luther & Leme

Species of flowering plant

Aechmea andersonii is a species of flowering plant in the genus Aechmea. This species is endemic to the State of Bahia in Brazil but cultivated elsewhere as an ornamental.

== Cultivars ==
- Aechmea 'John Anderson'
