= Atrypanius cretiger =

Scientific classification
- Kingdom: Animalia
- Phylum: Arthropoda
- Class: Insecta
- Order: Coleoptera
- Suborder: Polyphaga
- Infraorder: Cucujiformia
- Family: Cerambycidae
- Genus: Atrypanius
- Species: A. cretiger

Binomial name
- Atrypanius cretiger (White, 1855)

Species of beetle

Atrypanius cretiger is a species of longhorn beetle of the subfamily Lamiinae. It was described by White in 1855, and is known from Mexico to Panama, and Colombia.
