= Acinopus doderoi =

Scientific classification
- Kingdom: Animalia
- Phylum: Arthropoda
- Clade: Pancrustacea
- Class: Insecta
- Order: Coleoptera
- Suborder: Adephaga
- Family: Carabidae
- Genus: Acinopus
- Species: A. doderoi

Binomial name
- Acinopus doderoi Gudelli, 1925

Species of beetle

Acinopus doderoi is a species of ground beetle in the subfamily Harpalinae and subgenus Acinopus (Acinopus).
