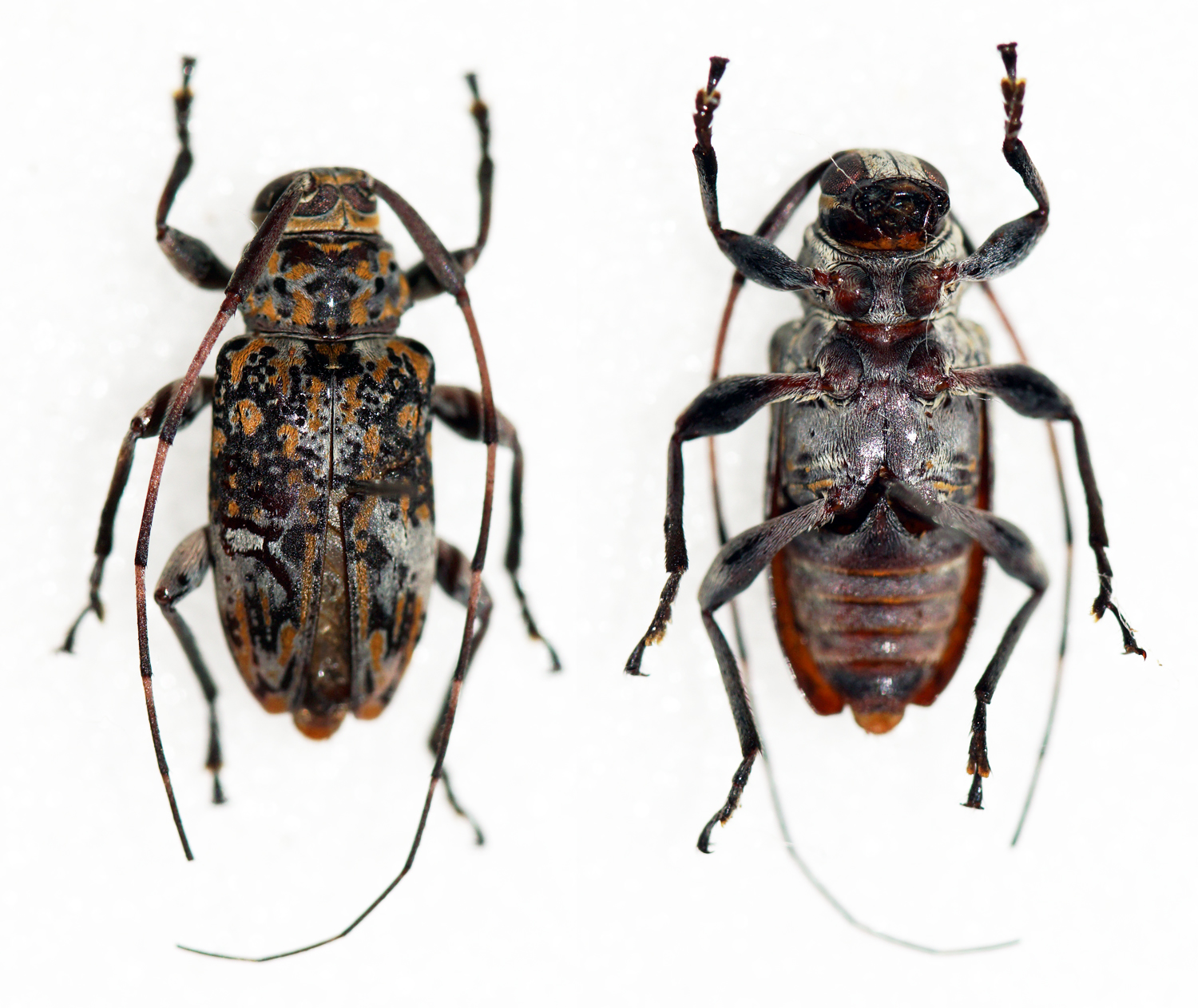

Scientific classification
- Kingdom: Animalia
- Phylum: Arthropoda
- Class: Insecta
- Order: Coleoptera
- Suborder: Polyphaga
- Infraorder: Cucujiformia
- Family: Cerambycidae
- Genus: Atrypanius
- Species: A. conspersus

Binomial name
- Atrypanius conspersus (Germar, 1824)

= Atrypanius conspersus =

Species of beetle

Atrypanius conspersus is a species of longhorn beetle of the subfamily Lamiinae. It was described by Ernst Friedrich Germar in 1824 and is known from Mexico to Panama, as well as southern Amer and Bolivia. It also inhabits woodlands of Upper Amazons and capital of Brazil, Rio de Janeiro.
