= Acinopus labiatus =

Scientific classification
- Kingdom: Animalia
- Phylum: Arthropoda
- Clade: Pancrustacea
- Class: Insecta
- Order: Coleoptera
- Suborder: Adephaga
- Family: Carabidae
- Genus: Acinopus
- Species: A. labiatus

Binomial name
- Acinopus labiatus (Erichson, 1843)

Synonyms
- Cratognathus labiatus Erichson, 1843

Species of beetle

Acinopus labiatus is a species of ground beetle in the subfamily Harpalinae, subgenus Acinopus (Nesarpax). It is endemic to Cape Verde.
