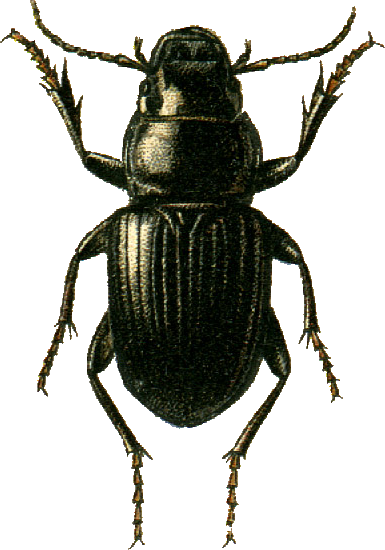

Scientific classification
- Kingdom: Animalia
- Phylum: Arthropoda
- Clade: Pancrustacea
- Class: Insecta
- Order: Coleoptera
- Suborder: Adephaga
- Family: Carabidae
- Genus: Acinopus
- Species: A. ammophilus

Binomial name
- Acinopus ammophilus Dejean, 1829

= Acinopus ammophilus =

Species of beetle

Acinopus ammophilus is a species of ground beetle in the subfamily Harpalinae and the only species in the subgenus Acinopus (Osimus).
