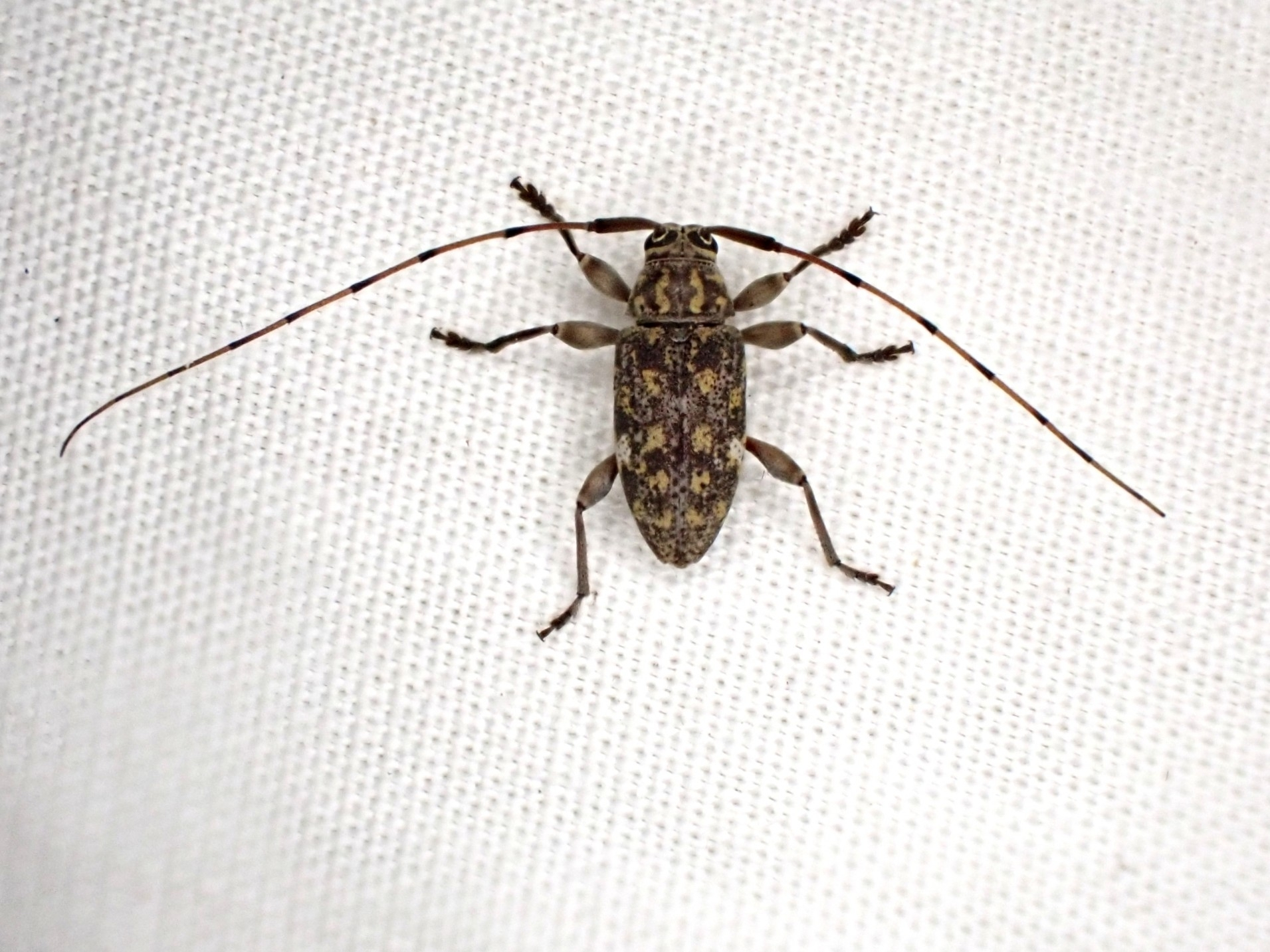

Scientific classification
- Kingdom: Animalia
- Phylum: Arthropoda
- Class: Insecta
- Order: Coleoptera
- Suborder: Polyphaga
- Infraorder: Cucujiformia
- Family: Cerambycidae
- Genus: Atrypanius
- Species: A. remissus

Binomial name
- Atrypanius remissus (Erichson, 1847)

= Atrypanius remissus =

Species of beetle

Atrypanius remissus is a species of longhorn beetle of the subfamily Lamiinae. It was described by Wilhelm Ferdinand Erichson in 1847, and is known from northwestern Brazil, eastern Ecuador, Peru, French Guiana, and Bolivia.
