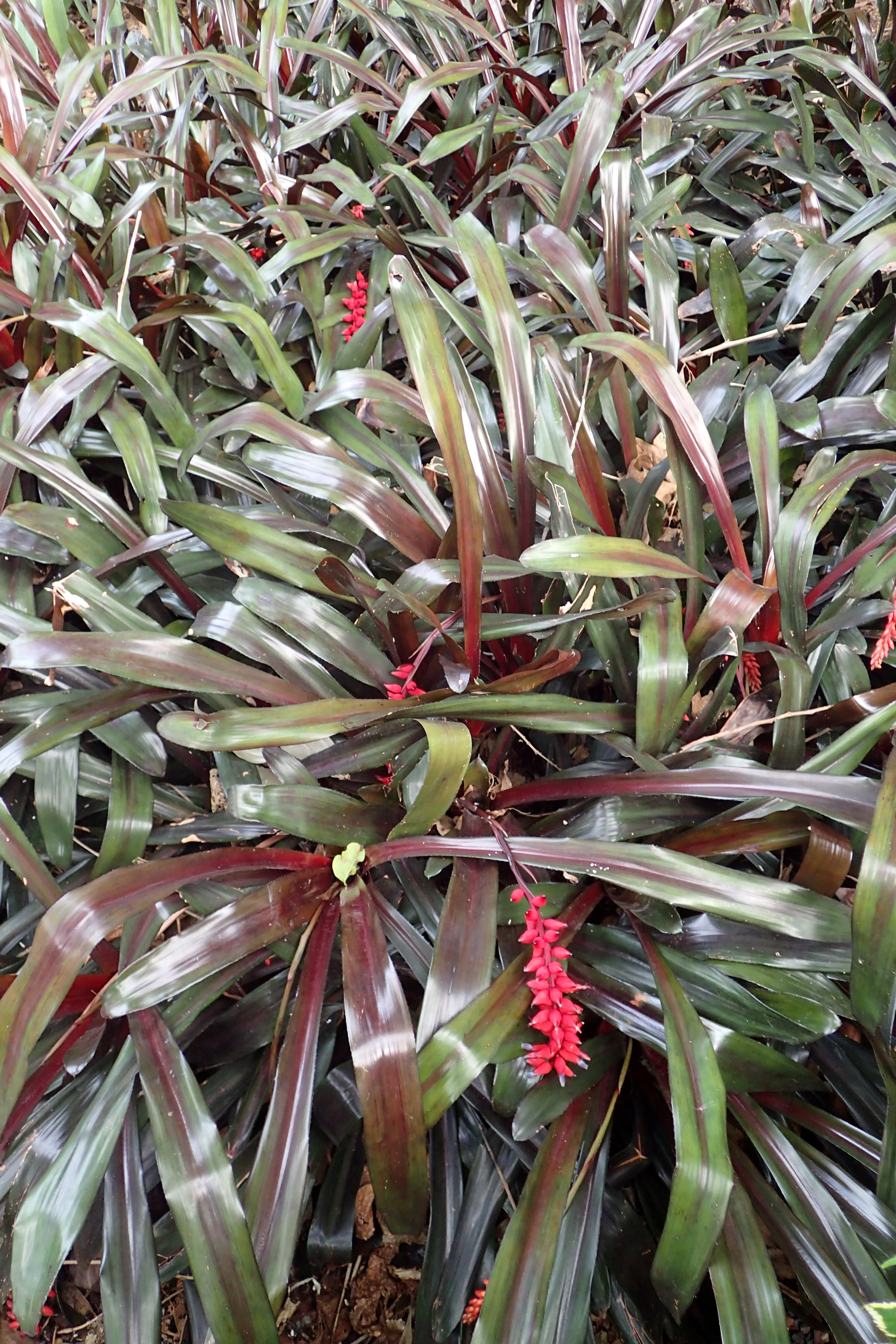

Scientific classification
- Kingdom: Plantae
- Clade: Tracheophytes
- Clade: Angiosperms
- Clade: Monocots
- Clade: Commelinids
- Order: Poales
- Family: Bromeliaceae
- Genus: Aechmea
- Subgenus: Aechmea subg. Lamprococcus
- Species: A. warasii

Binomial name
- Aechmea warasii E.Pereira

Synonyms
- Lamprococcus warasii (E.Pereira) L.B.Sm. & W.J.Kress; Aechmea warasii var. discolor E.Pereira; Aechmea racinae var. intermedia E.Pereira; Aechmea warasii var. intermedia (E.Pereira) E.Pereira & Leme

= Aechmea warasii =

Species of flowering plant

Aechmea warasii is a plant species in the genus Aechmea. This species is endemic to the State of Espírito Santo in eastern Brazil.

== Cultivars ==
- Aechmea 'Angulation'
- Aechmea 'Greg Schol'
