= Acinopus khalisensis =

Scientific classification
- Kingdom: Animalia
- Phylum: Arthropoda
- Clade: Pancrustacea
- Class: Insecta
- Order: Coleoptera
- Suborder: Adephaga
- Family: Carabidae
- Genus: Acinopus
- Species: A. khalisensis

Binomial name
- Acinopus khalisensis Ali, 1967

Species of beetle

Acinopus khalisensis is a species of ground beetle in the subfamily Harpalinae and the subgenus Acinopus (Oedemalicus).
