= Acinopus megacephalus =

Scientific classification
- Kingdom: Animalia
- Phylum: Arthropoda
- Clade: Pancrustacea
- Class: Insecta
- Order: Coleoptera
- Suborder: Adephaga
- Family: Carabidae
- Genus: Acinopus
- Species: A. megacephalus

Binomial name
- Acinopus megacephalus P. Rossi, 1794

Species of beetle

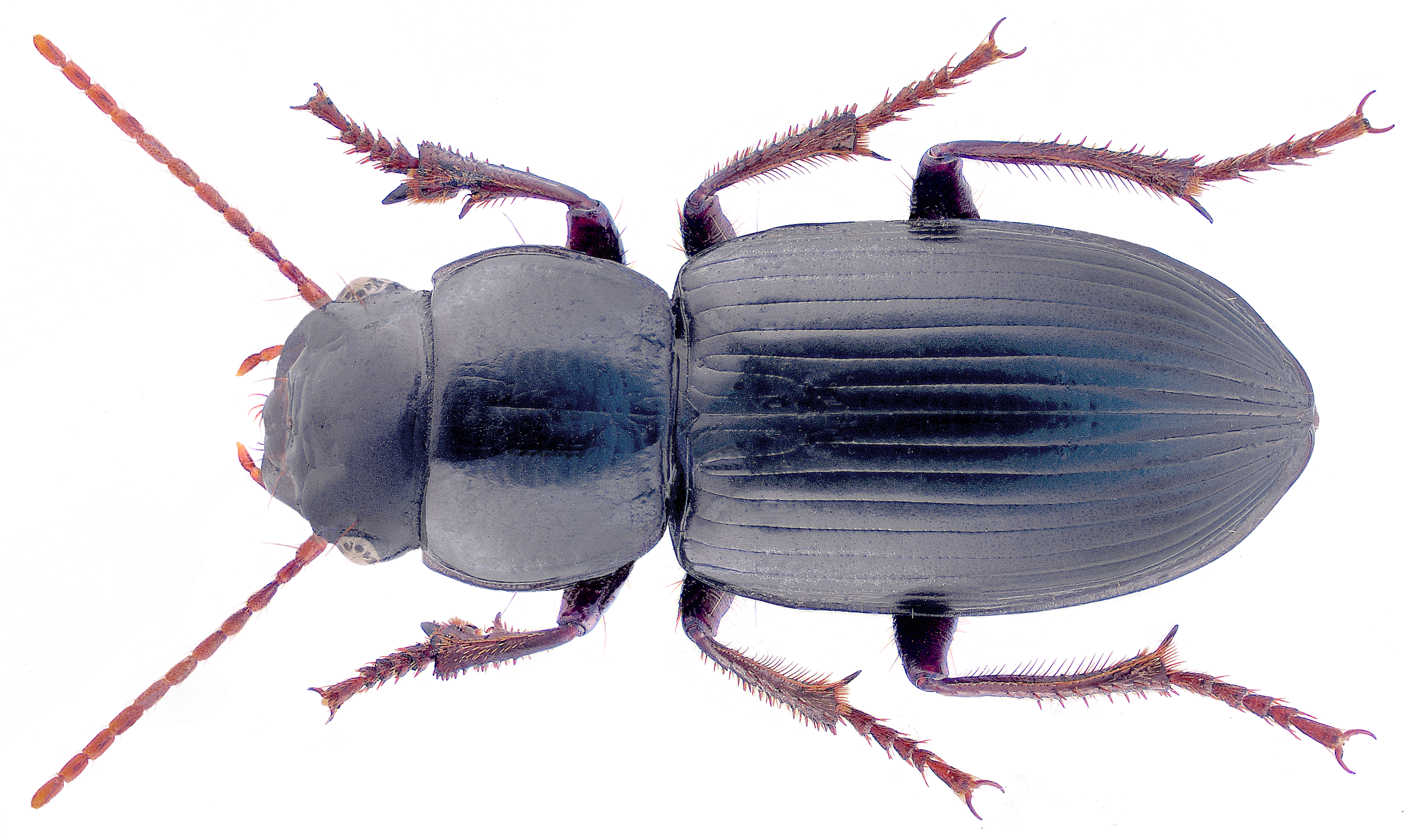
Acinopus megacephalus from above

Acinopus megacephalus is a species of ground beetle in the subfamily Harpalinae and the subgenus Acinopus (Oedemalicus).
