= Acinopus grassator =

Scientific classification
- Kingdom: Animalia
- Phylum: Arthropoda
- Clade: Pancrustacea
- Class: Insecta
- Order: Coleoptera
- Suborder: Adephaga
- Family: Carabidae
- Genus: Acinopus
- Species: A. grassator

Binomial name
- Acinopus grassator Coquerel, 1859

Species of beetle

Acinopus grassator is a species of ground beetle in the subfamily Harpalinae and subgenus Acinopus (Acinopus).
