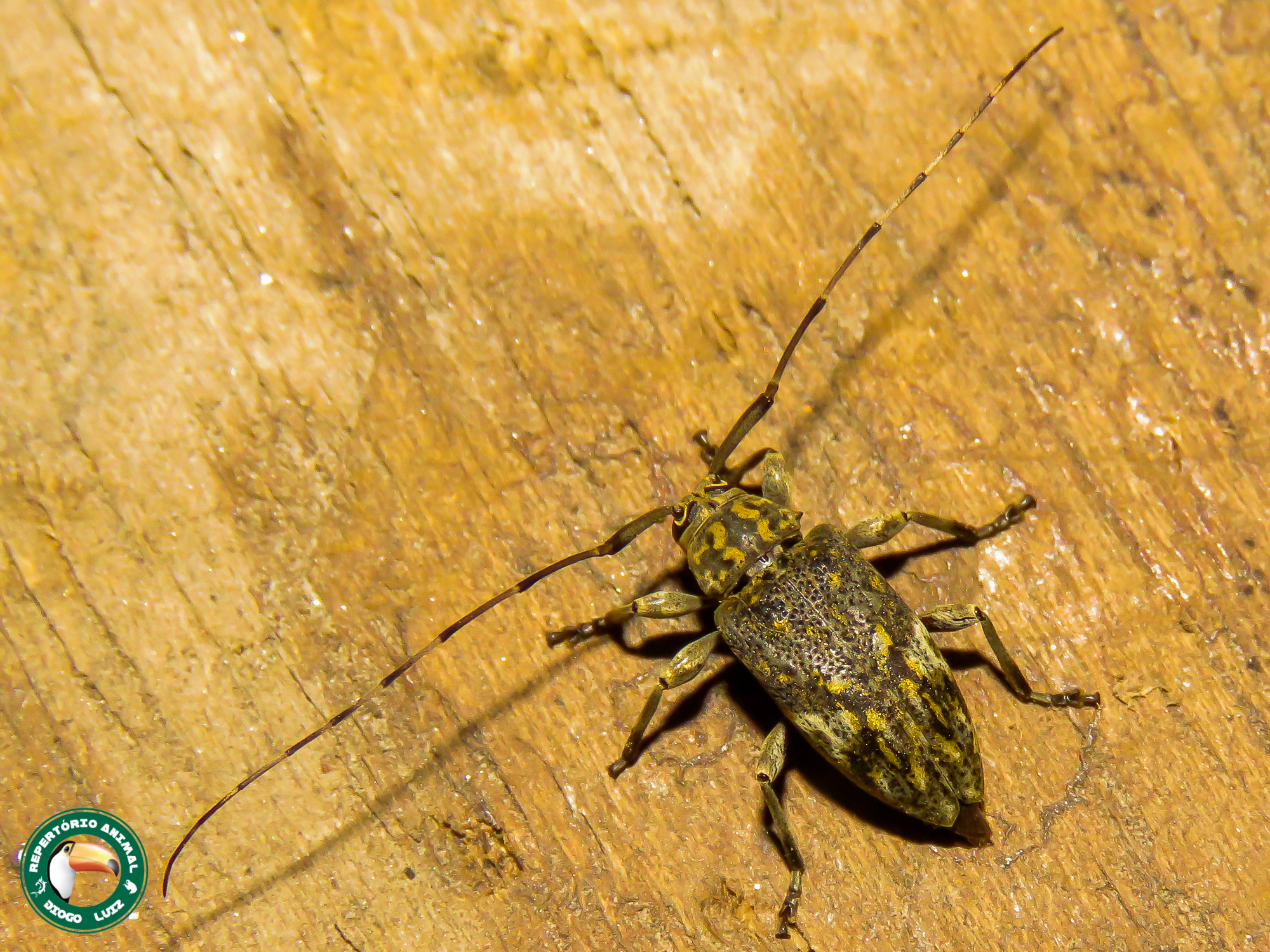

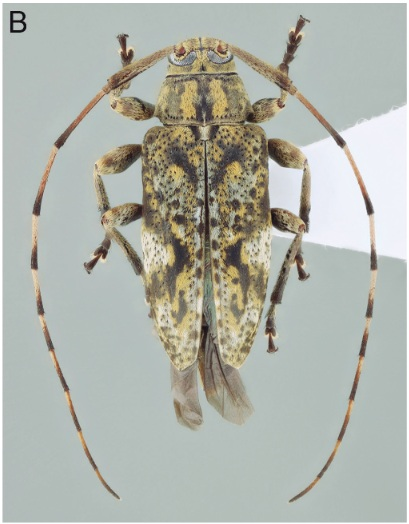

Scientific classification
- Kingdom: Animalia
- Phylum: Arthropoda
- Clade: Pancrustacea
- Class: Insecta
- Order: Coleoptera
- Suborder: Polyphaga
- Infraorder: Cucujiformia
- Family: Cerambycidae
- Genus: Atrypanius
- Species: A. lignarius

Binomial name
- Atrypanius lignarius (Bates, 1864)

Synonyms
- Nyssodrys lignaria Bates, 1864; Nyssodrysina lignaria

= Atrypanius lignarius =

Species of beetle

Atrypanius lignarius is a species of beetle in the family Cerambycidae. It was described by Henry Walter Bates in 1864. It is found in Brazil (Bahia, Minas Gerais, Espirito Santo, Rio de Janeiro, São Paulo, Paraná, Santa Catarina, Rio Grande do Sul), Paraguay and Argentina.
