= Aechmea racinae =

Scientific classification
- Kingdom: Plantae
- Clade: Tracheophytes
- Clade: Angiosperms
- Clade: Monocots
- Clade: Commelinids
- Order: Poales
- Family: Bromeliaceae
- Genus: Aechmea
- Subgenus: Aechmea subg. Lamprococcus
- Species: A. racinae

Binomial name
- Aechmea racinae L.B.Sm.

Synonyms
- Lamprococcus racinae (L.B.Sm.) L.B.Sm. & W.J.Kress

Species of flowering plant

Aechmea racinae, or Christmas jewels, is a species of flowering plant in the genus Aechmea, of the family Bromeliaceae. This species is endemic to the State of Espírito Santo in eastern Brazil. A. racinae grows best in partial sun and does not tolerate freezing temperatures.

Aechmea racinae is an epiphytic evergreen perennial, forming basal rosettes of strap-shaped leaves, with arching racemes of tubular red and yellow flowers that give way to berries. In temperate regions it is often grown as a houseplant. It has gained the Royal Horticultural Society's Award of Garden Merit.

== Varieties ==
Three varieties are accepted:

1. Aechmea racinae var. erecta L.B.Sm.
2. Aechmea racinae var. racinae
3. Aechmea racinae var. tubiformis E.Pereira

== Cultivars ==
Numerous cultivars have been named, including

- Aechmea 'Avarua'
- Aechmea 'Black Jack'
- Aechmea 'Candy Stripe'
- Aechmea 'Exotica'
- Aechmea 'Foster's Favorite'
- Aechmea 'Foster's Favorite Favorite'
- Aechmea 'Harlekin'
- Aechmea 'Red Ribbon'
