= Atrypanius polyspilus =

Scientific classification
- Kingdom: Animalia
- Phylum: Arthropoda
- Class: Insecta
- Order: Coleoptera
- Suborder: Polyphaga
- Infraorder: Cucujiformia
- Family: Cerambycidae
- Genus: Atrypanius
- Species: A. polyspilus

Binomial name
- Atrypanius polyspilus (White, 1855)

Synonyms
- Nyssodrysina polyspila (White, 1855)

Species of beetle

Atrypanius polyspilus is a species of beetle in the family Cerambycidae. It was described by Adam White in 1855.
