= Atrypanius binoculatus =

Scientific classification
- Kingdom: Animalia
- Phylum: Arthropoda
- Class: Insecta
- Order: Coleoptera
- Suborder: Polyphaga
- Infraorder: Cucujiformia
- Family: Cerambycidae
- Genus: Atrypanius
- Species: A. binoculatus

Binomial name
- Atrypanius binoculatus (Bates, 1864)

Species of beetle

Atrypanius binoculatus is a species of beetle in the family Cerambycidae. It was described by Henry Walter Bates in 1864.
