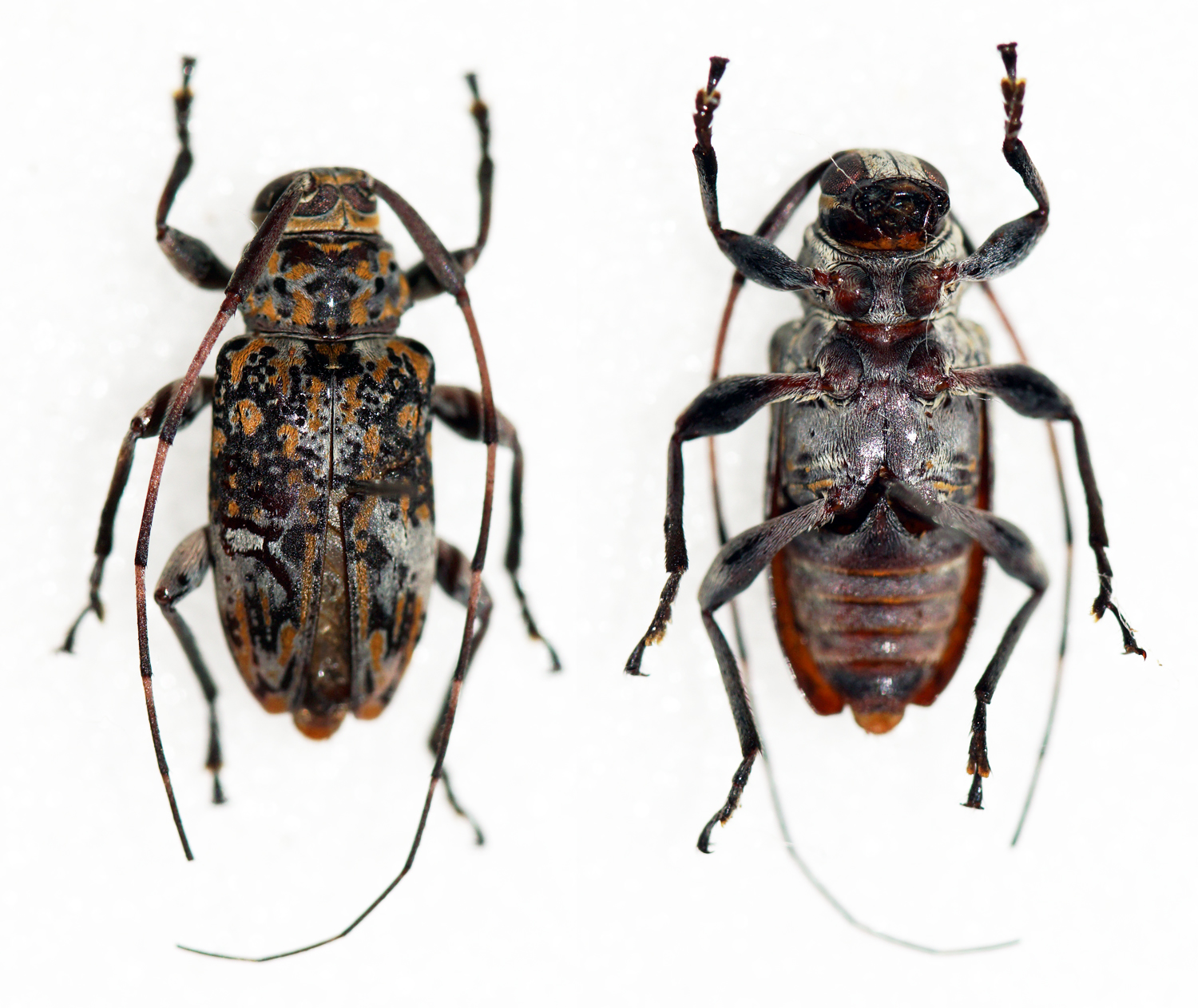
- Atrypanius conspersus

Scientific classification
- Kingdom: Animalia
- Phylum: Arthropoda
- Class: Insecta
- Order: Coleoptera
- Suborder: Polyphaga
- Infraorder: Cucujiformia
- Family: Cerambycidae
- Tribe: Acanthocinini
- Genus: Atrypanius; Bates, 1864

Synonyms
- Nyssodrys Bates, 1864; Nyssodrysina Casey, 1913; Nyssodrysola Gilmour, 1962; Sternidurges Gilmour, 1959; Antrypanius Melzer, 1927; Nyssocuneus Gilmour, 1960

= Atrypanius =

Genus of beetles

Atrypanius is a genus of beetles in the family Cerambycidae, first described by Henry Walter Bates in 1864.

== Species ==
Atrypanius contains the following species:

- Atrypanius albocinctus Melzer, 1930
- Atrypanius ambiguus Melzer, 1930
- Atrypanius audureaui Roguet, 2021
- Atrypanius binoculatus (Bates, 1864)
- Atrypanius cinerascens (Bates, 1864)
- Atrypanius conspersus (Germar, 1824)
- Atrypanius corticalis (Bates, 1864)
- Atrypanius cretiger (White, 1855)
- Atrypanius estebani Audureau & Demez, 2015
- Atrypanius exilis (Bates, 1885)
- Atrypanius haldemani (LeConte, 1852)
- Atrypanius heyrovskyi (Gilmour, 1960)
- Atrypanius implexus (Erichson, 1847)
- Atrypanius infimus (Bates, 1885)
- Atrypanius irrorellus Bates, 1885
- Atrypanius jauffreti Santos-Silva, 2021
- Atrypanius leucopygus (Bates, 1872)
- Atrypanius lignarius (Bates, 1864)
- Atrypanius lineatocollis (Bates, 1863)
- Atrypanius maculosus (Nascimento & Heffern, 2018)
- Atrypanius polyspilus (White, 1855)
- Atrypanius pulchellus (Bates, 1863)
- Atrypanius remissus (Erichson, 1847)
- Atrypanius satipoensis (Audureau & Demez, 2015)
- Atrypanius scitulus (Germar, 1824)
- Atrypanius scutellatus (Bates, 1866)
- Atrypanius spretus (Bates, 1864)
- Atrypanius unpanus Juarez-Noe & Gonzalez-Coronado, 2021
- Atrypanius venustus (Bates, 1863)
