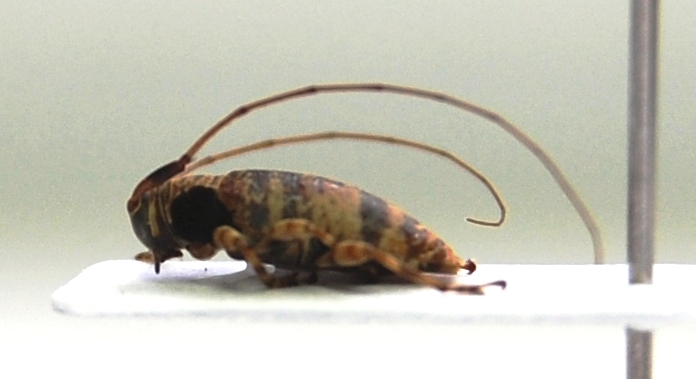

Scientific classification
- Kingdom: Animalia
- Phylum: Arthropoda
- Class: Insecta
- Order: Coleoptera
- Suborder: Polyphaga
- Infraorder: Cucujiformia
- Family: Cerambycidae
- Genus: Atrypanius
- Species: A. scitulus

Binomial name
- Atrypanius scitulus (Germar, 1824)

= Atrypanius scitulus =

Species of beetle

Atrypanius scitulus is a species of longhorn beetle of the subfamily Lamiinae. It was described by Ernst Friedrich Germar in 1824 and is known from eastern Brazil, eastern Ecuador, and French Guiana.
