= Amphionthe caudalis =

Scientific classification
- Domain: Eukaryota
- Kingdom: Animalia
- Phylum: Arthropoda
- Class: Insecta
- Order: Coleoptera
- Suborder: Polyphaga
- Infraorder: Cucujiformia
- Family: Cerambycidae
- Genus: Amphionthe
- Species: A. caudalis

Binomial name
- Amphionthe caudalis Schwarzer, 1929

Species of beetle

Amphionthe caudalis is a species of beetle in the family Cerambycidae. It was described by Schwarzer in 1929.
