= Acinopus haroldii =

Scientific classification
- Kingdom: Animalia
- Phylum: Arthropoda
- Clade: Pancrustacea
- Class: Insecta
- Order: Coleoptera
- Suborder: Adephaga
- Family: Carabidae
- Genus: Acinopus
- Species: A. haroldii

Binomial name
- Acinopus haroldii Schaum, 1863

Species of beetle

Acinopus haroldii is a species of ground beetle in the subfamily Harpalinae and the only species in the subgenus Acinopus (Acmastes).
