= Acinopus striolatus =

Scientific classification
- Kingdom: Animalia
- Phylum: Arthropoda
- Clade: Pancrustacea
- Class: Insecta
- Order: Coleoptera
- Suborder: Adephaga
- Family: Carabidae
- Genus: Acinopus
- Species: A. striolatus

Binomial name
- Acinopus striolatus Zoubkoff, 1833

Species of beetle

Acinopus striolatus is a species of ground beetle in the subfamily Harpalinae and the only species in the subgenus Acinopus (Haplacinopus).
