= Ateralphus javariensis =

Scientific classification
- Domain: Eukaryota
- Kingdom: Animalia
- Phylum: Arthropoda
- Class: Insecta
- Order: Coleoptera
- Suborder: Polyphaga
- Infraorder: Cucujiformia
- Family: Cerambycidae
- Genus: Ateralphus
- Species: A. javariensis

Binomial name
- Ateralphus javariensis (Lane, 1965)

Species of beetle

Ateralphus javariensis is a species of beetle in the family Cerambycidae. It was described by Lane in 1965.
