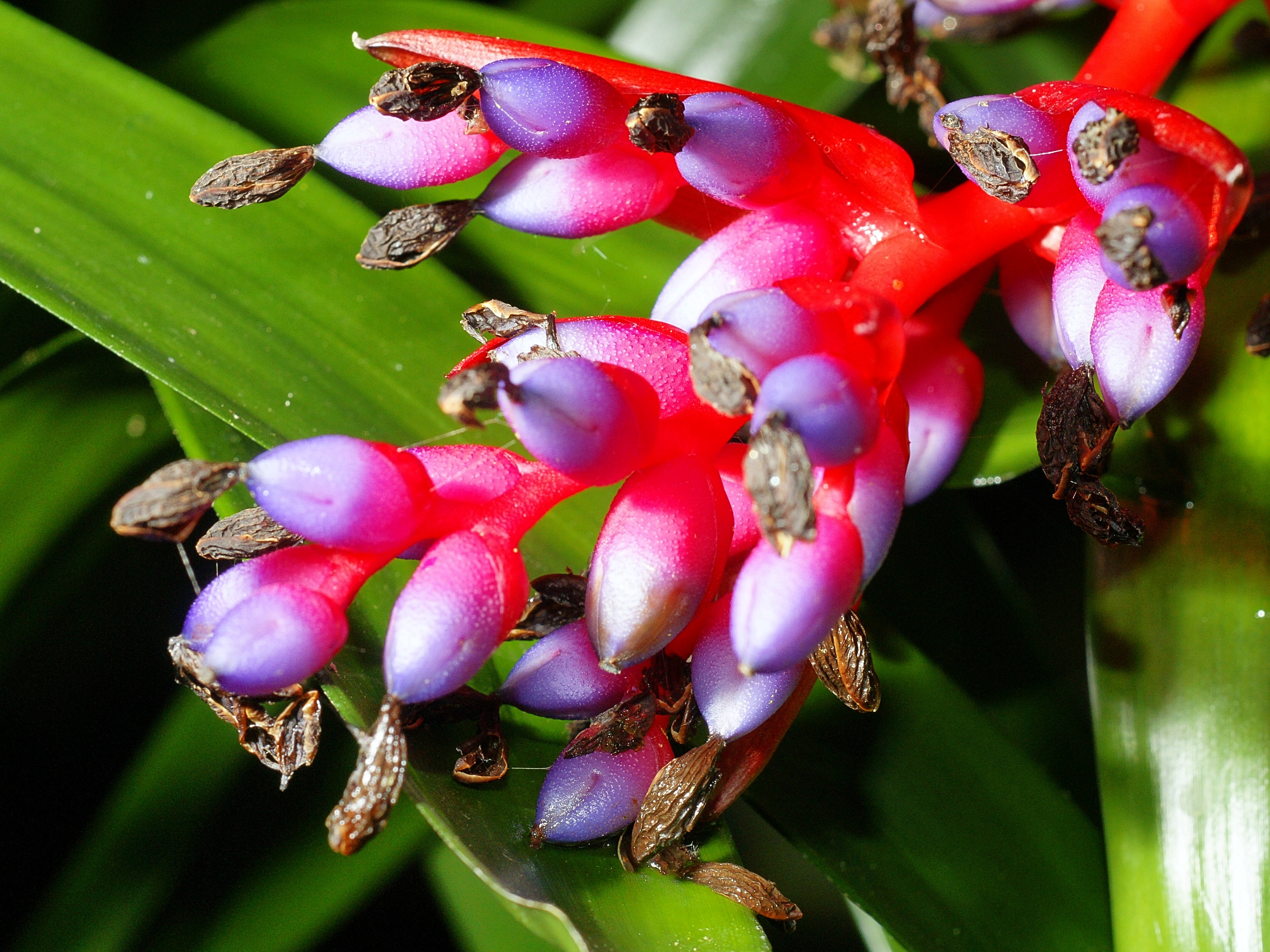

Scientific classification
- Kingdom: Plantae
- Clade: Tracheophytes
- Clade: Angiosperms
- Clade: Monocots
- Clade: Commelinids
- Order: Poales
- Family: Bromeliaceae
- Genus: Aechmea
- Subgenus: Aechmea subg. Lamprococcus
- Species: A. weilbachii

Binomial name
- Aechmea weilbachii Didrichsen

Synonyms
- Lamprococcus weilbachii (Didr.) E.Morren; Lamprococcus laurentianus K.Koch; Aechmea weilbachea Carrière; Aechmea subinermis Baker; Quesnelia glaziovii Baker

= Aechmea weilbachii =

Species of flowering plant

Aechmea weilbachii is a plant species in the genus Aechmea. This species is endemic to eastern Brazil, known from the States of Espírito Santo and Rio de Janeiro.

== Cultivars ==
Aechmea weilbachii is widely cultivated as an ornamental. Cultivars include

- Aechmea 'Dana J'
- Aechmea 'Distibachii'
- Aechmea 'Orange Sunrise'
- Aechmea 'Orange Sunset'
- Aechmea 'Porphyry Pearls'
- Aechmea 'Purple Gem'
- Aechmea 'Summerland'
- × Aechopsis 'Beacon'
