= Aechmea carvalhoi =

Scientific classification
- Kingdom: Plantae
- Clade: Embryophytes
- Clade: Tracheophytes
- Clade: Spermatophytes
- Clade: Angiosperms
- Clade: Monocots
- Clade: Commelinids
- Order: Poales
- Family: Bromeliaceae
- Genus: Aechmea
- Subgenus: Aechmea subg. Lamprococcus
- Species: A. carvalhoi

Binomial name
- Aechmea carvalhoi E. Pereira & Leme

Synonyms
- Lamprococcus carvalhoi (E.Pereira & Leme) L.B.Sm. & W.J.Kress

Species of flowering plant

Aechmea carvalhoi is a plant species in the genus Aechmea.

This bromeliad species is endemic to the State of Bahia, and to the Atlantic Forest biome (Mata Atlantica Brasileira), located in southeastern Brazil.
