= Aspergillus ambiguus =

Scientific classification
- Kingdom: Fungi
- Division: Ascomycota
- Class: Eurotiomycetes
- Order: Eurotiales
- Family: Aspergillaceae
- Genus: Aspergillus
- Species: A. ambiguus

Binomial name
- Aspergillus ambiguus Sappa (1955)

Species of fungus

Aspergillus ambiguus is a species of fungus in the genus Aspergillus. It is from the Terrei section. The species was first described in 1955. It has been reported to produce a butyrolactone and terrequinone A.

== Growth and morphology ==
A. ambiguus has been cultivated on both Czapek yeast extract agar (CYA) plates and Malt Extract Agar Oxoid® (MEAOX) plates. The growth morphology of the colonies can be seen in the pictures below.

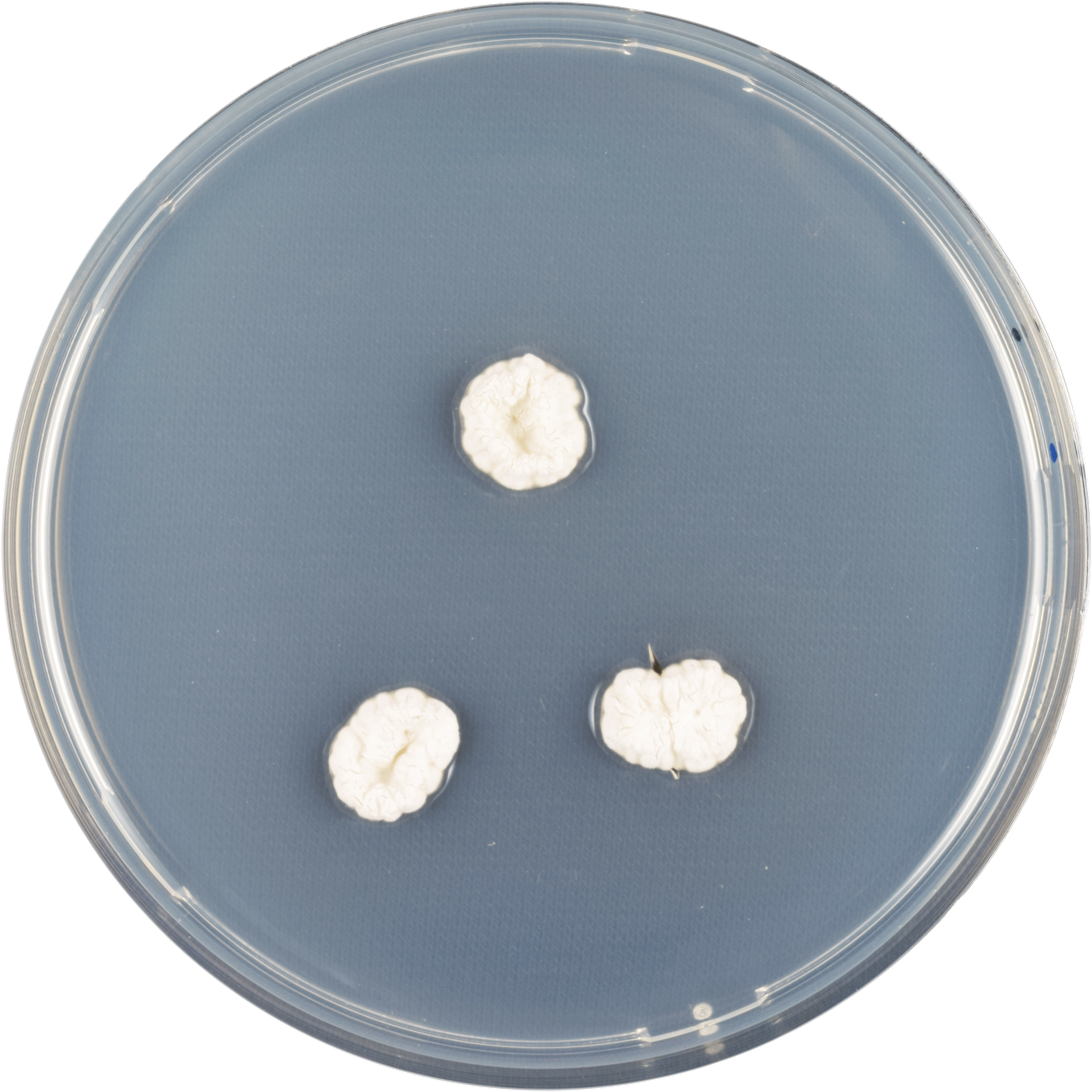
Aspergillus ambiguus growing on CYA plate

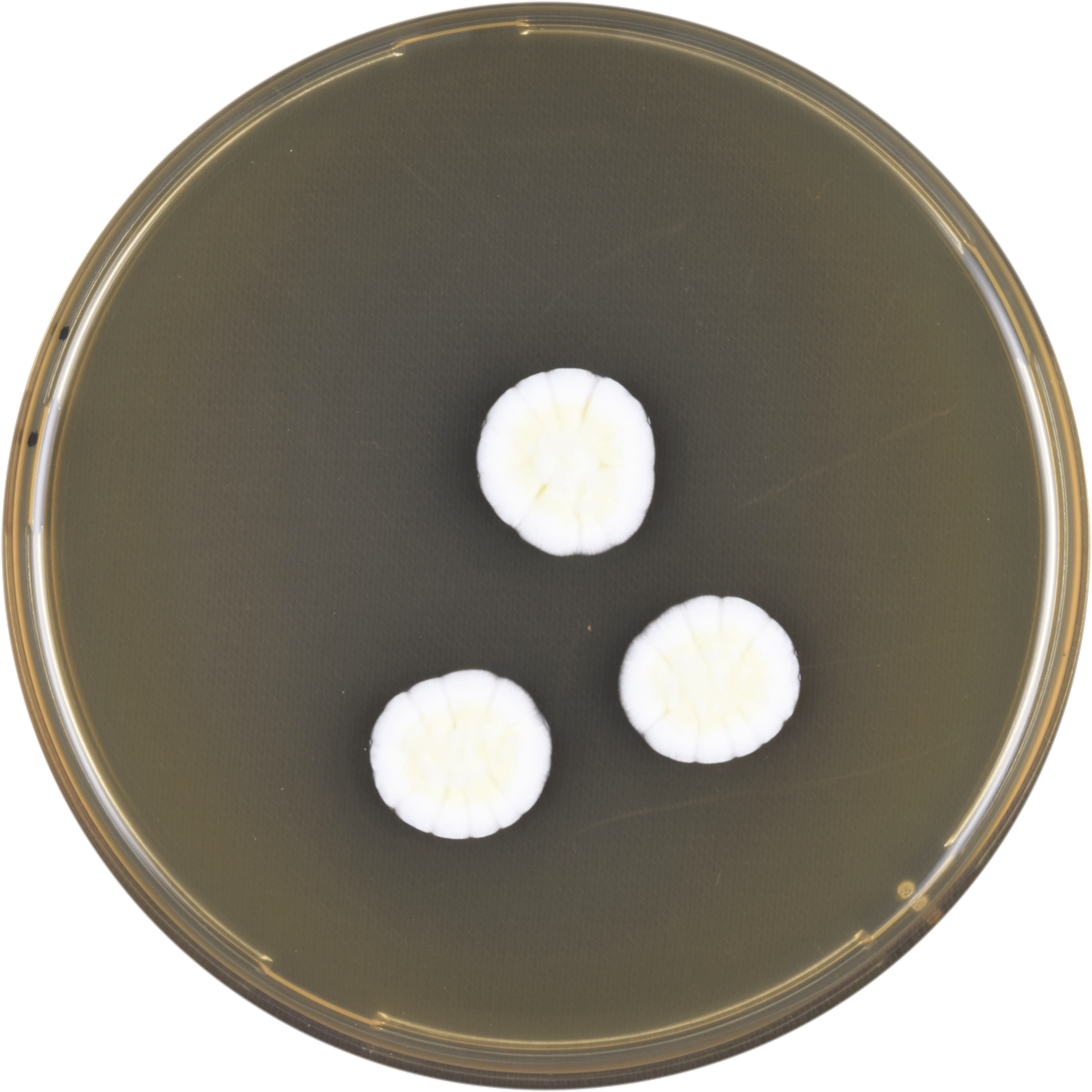
Aspergillus ambiguus growing on MEAOX plate
