= Ateralphus dejeani =

Scientific classification
- Kingdom: Animalia
- Phylum: Arthropoda
- Clade: Pancrustacea
- Class: Insecta
- Order: Coleoptera
- Suborder: Polyphaga
- Infraorder: Cucujiformia
- Family: Cerambycidae
- Genus: Ateralphus
- Species: A. dejeani

Binomial name
- Ateralphus dejeani (Lane, 1973)

Species of beetle

Ateralphus dejeani is a species of beetle in the family Cerambycidae. It was described by Lane in 1973. It is found in Peru, Brazil (Goiás, Bahia, Minas Gerais, Espírito Santo, Rio de Janeiro, São Paulo, Paraná, Santa Catarina, Rio Grande do Sul), Paraguay (Alto Paraná) and Argentina (Misiones).
