= Aechmea brevicollis =

Scientific classification
- Kingdom: Plantae
- Clade: Tracheophytes
- Clade: Angiosperms
- Clade: Monocots
- Clade: Commelinids
- Order: Poales
- Family: Bromeliaceae
- Genus: Aechmea
- Subgenus: Aechmea subg. Lamprococcus
- Species: A. brevicollis

Binomial name
- Aechmea brevicollis L.B.Sm.

Synonyms
- Lamprococcus brevicollis (L.B.Sm.) L.B.Sm. & W.J.Kress

Species of flowering plant

Aechmea brevicollis is a plant species in the genus Aechmea. It is native to Colombia, Venezuela, and northern Brazil.

== Cultivars ==
- Aechmea 'Jack'
- Aechmea 'Orange Sherbert'
