= Abacetus ambiguus =

Scientific classification
- Kingdom: Animalia
- Phylum: Arthropoda
- Class: Insecta
- Order: Coleoptera
- Suborder: Adephaga
- Family: Carabidae
- Genus: Abacetus
- Species: A. ambiguus

Binomial name
- Abacetus ambiguus Straneo, 1969

Species of beetle

Abacetus ambiguus is a species of ground beetle in the subfamily Pterostichinae. It was described by Straneo in 1969 and is an endemic species found in Côte d'Ivoire, Africa.
