= Aedoeus brevicollis =

Scientific classification
- Kingdom: Animalia
- Phylum: Arthropoda
- Class: Insecta
- Order: Coleoptera
- Suborder: Polyphaga
- Infraorder: Cucujiformia
- Family: Cerambycidae
- Genus: Aedoeus
- Species: A. brevicollis

Binomial name
- Aedoeus brevicollis Fairmaire, 1901

Species of beetle

Aedoeus brevicollis is a species of beetle in the family Cerambycidae. It was described by Fairmaire in 1901.
