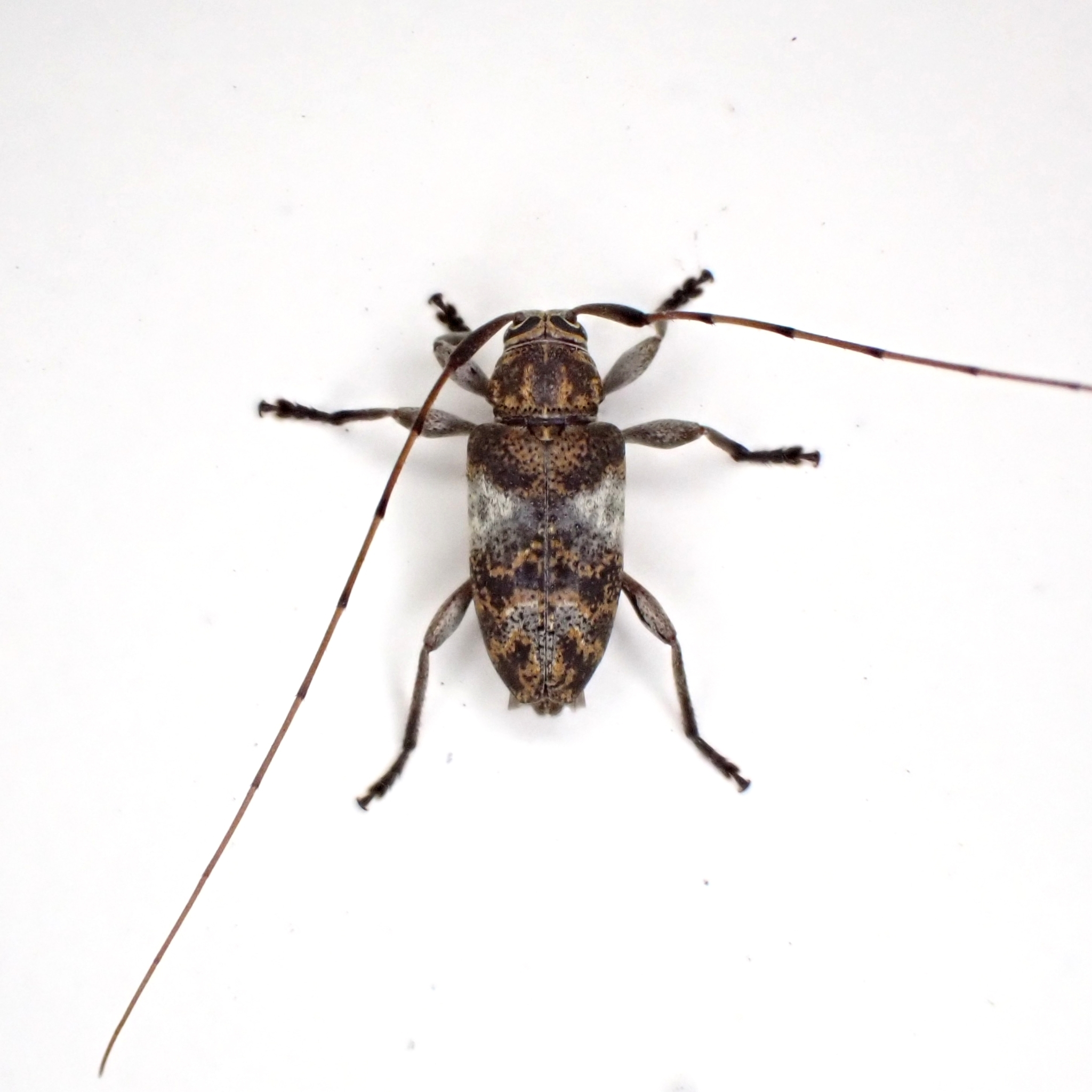

Scientific classification
- Kingdom: Animalia
- Phylum: Arthropoda
- Class: Insecta
- Order: Coleoptera
- Suborder: Polyphaga
- Infraorder: Cucujiformia
- Family: Cerambycidae
- Genus: Atrypanius
- Species: A. ambiguus

Binomial name
- Atrypanius ambiguus Melzer, 1930

= Atrypanius ambiguus =

Species of beetle

Atrypanius ambiguus is a species of longhorn beetles of the subfamily Lamiinae. It was described by Melzer in 1930, and is known from southeastern Brazil and Bolivia.
