= Acinopus antoinei =

Scientific classification
- Kingdom: Animalia
- Phylum: Arthropoda
- Clade: Pancrustacea
- Class: Insecta
- Order: Coleoptera
- Suborder: Adephaga
- Family: Carabidae
- Genus: Acinopus
- Species: A. antoinei

Binomial name
- Acinopus antoinei Puel, 1934

Species of beetle

Acinopus antoinei is a species of ground beetle in the subfamily Harpalinae and subgenus Acinopus (Acinopus).
