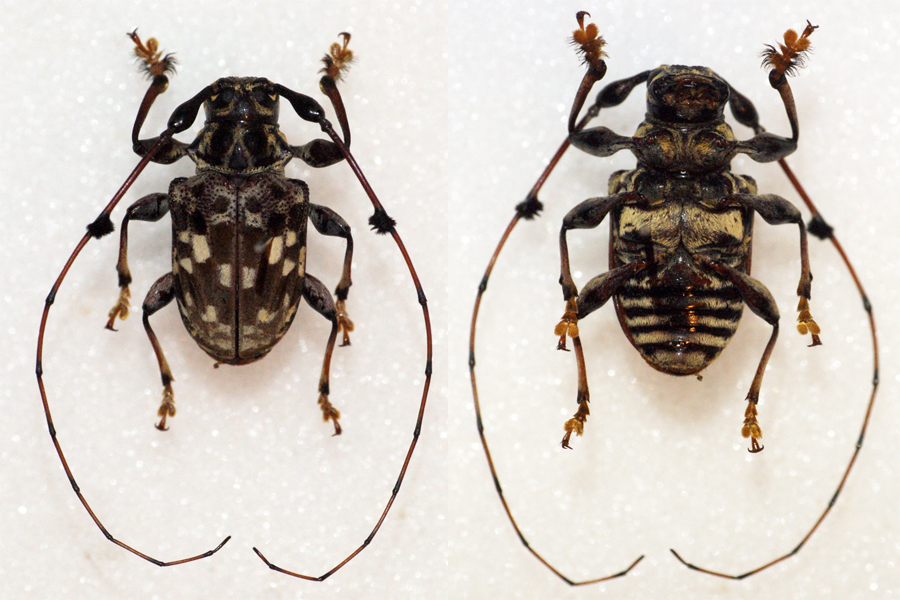
- Anisocerus stellatus

Scientific classification
- Kingdom: Animalia
- Phylum: Arthropoda
- Class: Insecta
- Order: Coleoptera
- Suborder: Polyphaga
- Infraorder: Cucujiformia
- Family: Cerambycidae
- Subfamily: Lamiinae
- Tribe: Anisocerini

= Anisocerini =

Tribe of beetles

Anisocerini is a tribe of longhorn beetles of the subfamily Lamiinae.

== Taxonomy ==
- Acanthotritus
- Anisocerus
- Badenella
- Batesbeltia
- Caciomorpha
- Chalastinus
- Chapareia
- Cyclopeplus
- Demophoo
- Eusthenomus
- Fredlanella
- Gounellea
- Gymnocerina
- Gymnocerus
- Homoephloeus
- Hoplistocerus
- Jurua
- Onychocerus
- Parachalastinus
- Phacellocera
- Phacellocerina
- Platysternus
- Satipoella
- Thryallis
- Trigonopeplus
- Xylotribus
