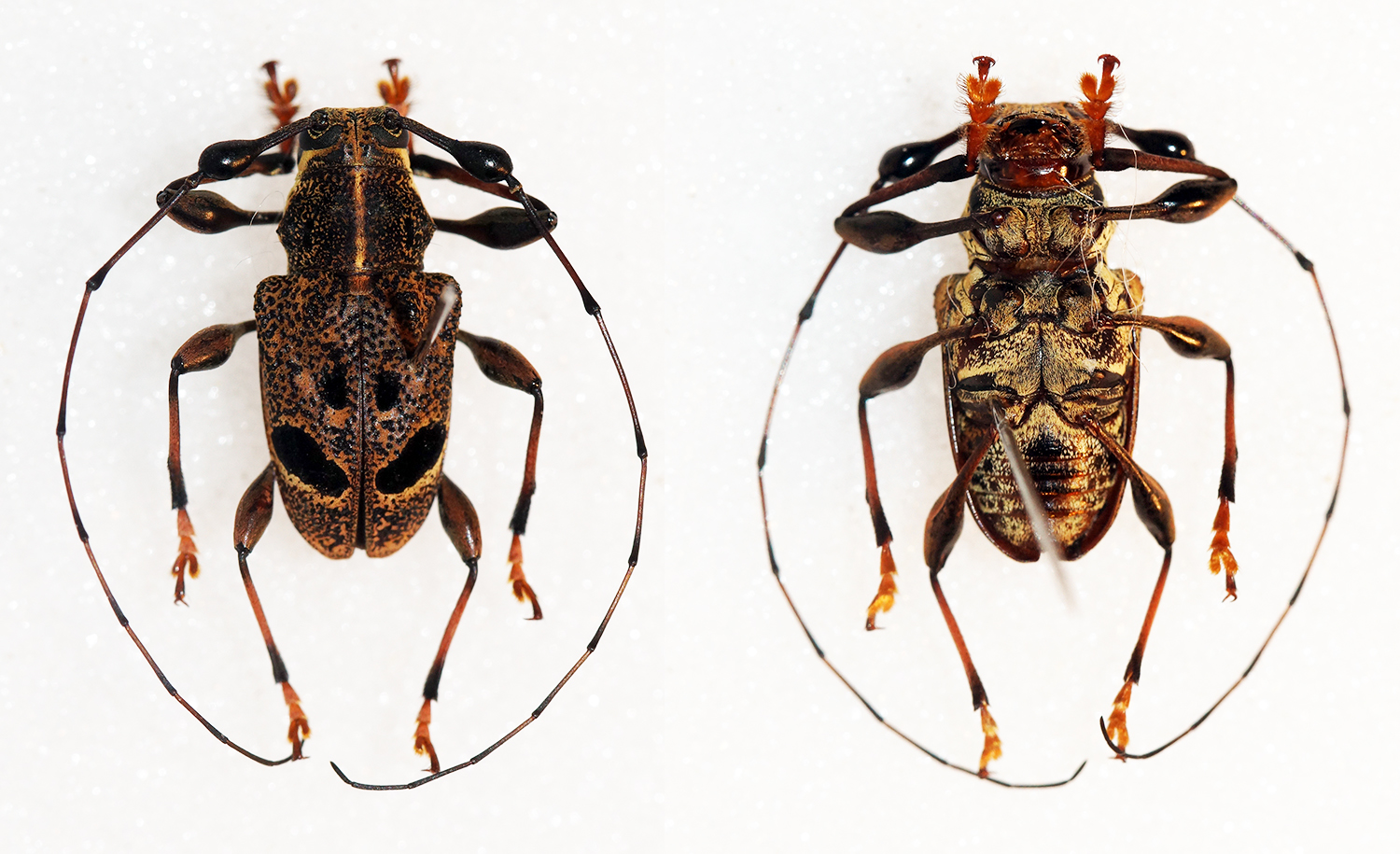

Scientific classification
- Kingdom: Animalia
- Phylum: Arthropoda
- Class: Insecta
- Order: Coleoptera
- Suborder: Polyphaga
- Infraorder: Cucujiformia
- Family: Cerambycidae
- Genus: Chalastinus
- Species: C. recticornis

Binomial name
- Chalastinus recticornis Bates, 1875

= Chalastinus recticornis =

Species of beetle

Chalastinus recticornis is a species of beetle in the family Cerambycidae. It was described by Henry Walter Bates in 1875.
