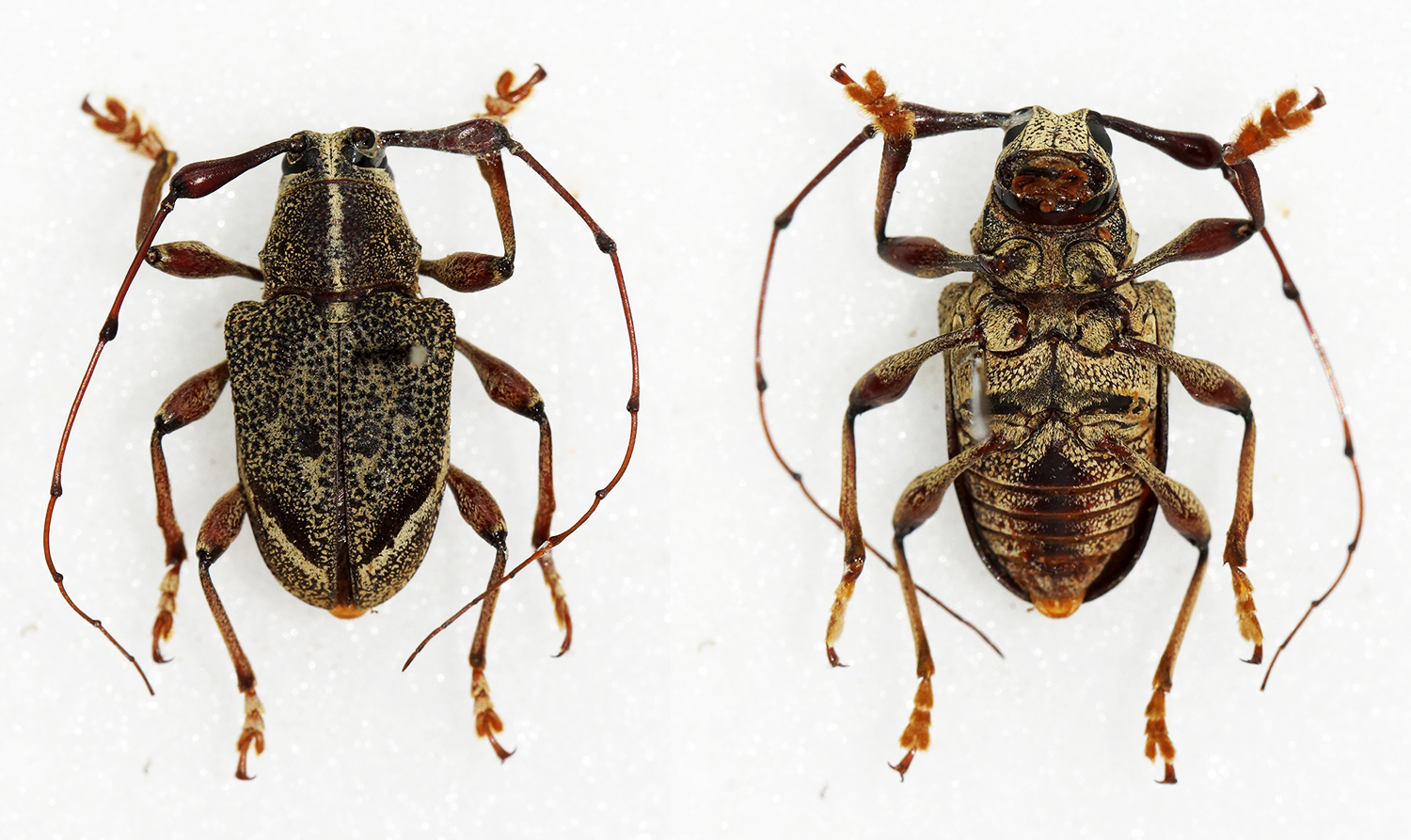

Scientific classification
- Kingdom: Animalia
- Phylum: Arthropoda
- Class: Insecta
- Order: Coleoptera
- Suborder: Polyphaga
- Infraorder: Cucujiformia
- Family: Cerambycidae
- Genus: Chalastinus
- Species: C. egensis

Binomial name
- Chalastinus egensis (White, 1855)

= Chalastinus egensis =

Species of beetle

Chalastinus egensis is a species of beetle in the family Cerambycidae. It was described by White in 1855.
