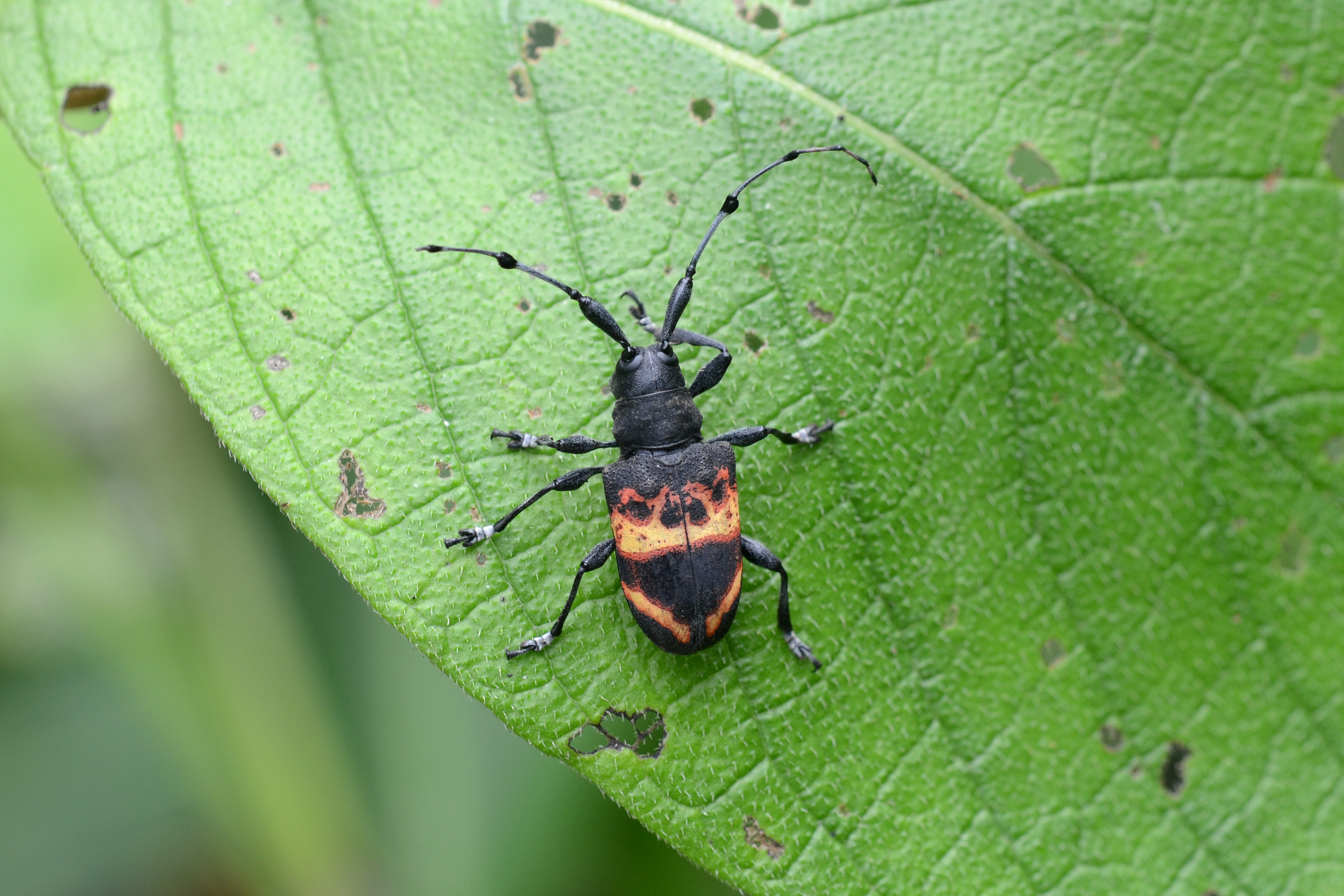

Scientific classification
- Kingdom: Animalia
- Phylum: Arthropoda
- Class: Insecta
- Order: Coleoptera
- Suborder: Polyphaga
- Infraorder: Cucujiformia
- Family: Cerambycidae
- Genus: Parachalastinus
- Species: P. championi

Binomial name
- Parachalastinus championi (Bates, 1885)

= Parachalastinus championi =

Species of beetle

Parachalastinus championi is a species of beetle in the family Cerambycidae. It was described by Bates in 1885.
