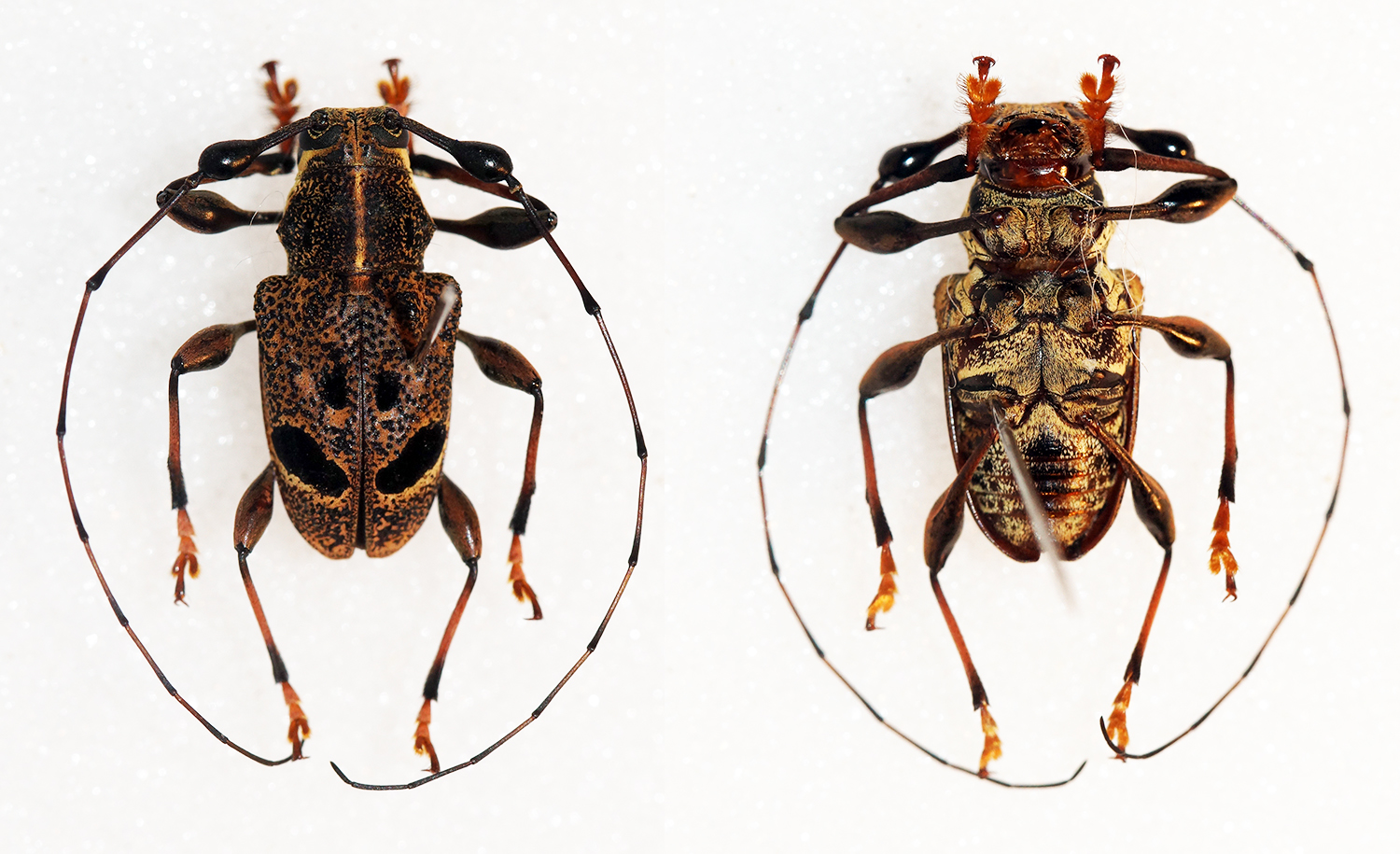
- Chalastinus recticornis

Scientific classification
- Kingdom: Animalia
- Phylum: Arthropoda
- Class: Insecta
- Order: Coleoptera
- Suborder: Polyphaga
- Infraorder: Cucujiformia
- Family: Cerambycidae
- Tribe: Anisocerini
- Genus: Chalastinus

= Chalastinus =

Genus of beetles

Chalastinus is a genus of beetles in the family Cerambycidae, containing the following species:

- Chalastinus egensis (White, 1855)
- Chalastinus pantherinus Lacordaire, 1872
- Chalastinus recticornis Bates, 1875
