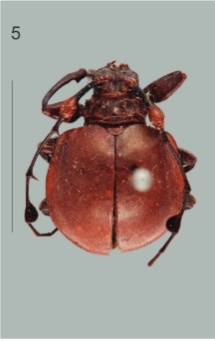

Scientific classification
- Kingdom: Animalia
- Phylum: Arthropoda
- Class: Insecta
- Order: Coleoptera
- Suborder: Polyphaga
- Infraorder: Cucujiformia
- Family: Cerambycidae
- Genus: Cyclopeplus
- Species: C. peruvianus

Binomial name
- Cyclopeplus peruvianus Tippmann, 1939

= Cyclopeplus peruvianus =

Species of beetle

Cyclopeplus peruvianus is a species of beetle in the family Cerambycidae. It was described by Tippmann in 1939.
