= Xylotribus =

Scientific classification
- Kingdom: Animalia
- Phylum: Arthropoda
- Class: Insecta
- Order: Coleoptera
- Suborder: Polyphaga
- Infraorder: Cucujiformia
- Family: Cerambycidae
- Tribe: Anisocerini
- Genus: Xylotribus

Genus of beetles

Xylotribus is a genus of beetles in the family Cerambycidae, containing the following species:

- Xylotribus decorator (Fabricius, 1801)
- Xylotribus pinacopterus Lane, 1964
