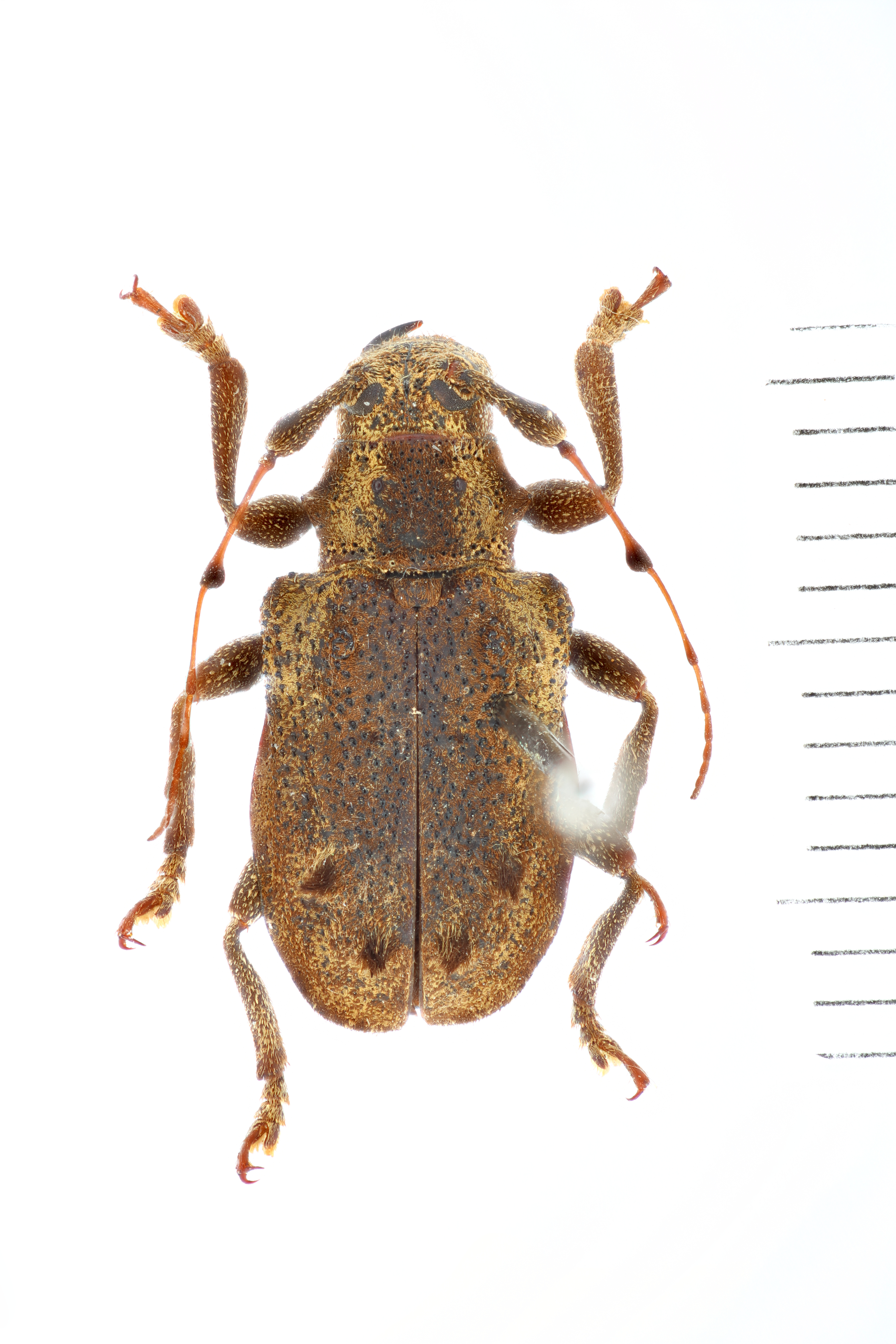

Scientific classification
- Kingdom: Animalia
- Phylum: Arthropoda
- Class: Insecta
- Order: Coleoptera
- Suborder: Polyphaga
- Infraorder: Cucujiformia
- Family: Cerambycidae
- Genus: Phacellocerina
- Species: P. seclusa

Binomial name
- Phacellocerina seclusa Lane, 1964

= Phacellocerina seclusa =

Species of beetle

Phacellocerina seclusa is a species of beetle in the family Cerambycidae. It was described by Lane in 1964.
