= Satipoella =

Scientific classification
- Kingdom: Animalia
- Phylum: Arthropoda
- Class: Insecta
- Order: Coleoptera
- Suborder: Polyphaga
- Infraorder: Cucujiformia
- Family: Cerambycidae
- Tribe: Anisocerini
- Genus: Satipoella

Genus of beetles

Satipoella is a genus of beetles in the family Cerambycidae, containing the following species:

- Satipoella bufo (Thomson, 1868)
- Satipoella heilipoides Lane, 1964
- Satipoella ochroma Julio, 2003
