= Caciomorpha susua =

Scientific classification
- Kingdom: Animalia
- Phylum: Arthropoda
- Class: Insecta
- Order: Coleoptera
- Suborder: Polyphaga
- Infraorder: Cucujiformia
- Family: Cerambycidae
- Genus: Caciomorpha
- Species: C. susua

Binomial name
- Caciomorpha susua (Martins & Galileo, 1996)

Species of beetle

Caciomorpha susua is a species of beetle in the family Cerambycidae. It was described by Martins and Galileo in 1996.
