= Acanthotritus =

Scientific classification
- Domain: Eukaryota
- Kingdom: Animalia
- Phylum: Arthropoda
- Class: Insecta
- Order: Coleoptera
- Suborder: Polyphaga
- Infraorder: Cucujiformia
- Family: Cerambycidae
- Tribe: Anisocerini
- Genus: Acanthotritus
- Species: A. dorsalis

Binomial name
- Acanthotritus dorsalis White, 1855

Genus of beetles

Acanthotritus is a genus of beetles in the family Cerambycidae, containing a single species, Acanthotritus dorsalis. It was described by White in 1855.
