= Cyclopeplus batesi =

Scientific classification
- Domain: Eukaryota
- Kingdom: Animalia
- Phylum: Arthropoda
- Class: Insecta
- Order: Coleoptera
- Suborder: Polyphaga
- Infraorder: Cucujiformia
- Family: Cerambycidae
- Genus: Cyclopeplus
- Species: C. batesi

Binomial name
- Cyclopeplus batesi Thomson, 1861

Species of beetle

Cyclopeplus batesi is a species of beetle in the family Cerambycidae. It was described by Thomson in 1861.
