= Phacellocerina silvanae =

Scientific classification
- Domain: Eukaryota
- Kingdom: Animalia
- Phylum: Arthropoda
- Class: Insecta
- Order: Coleoptera
- Suborder: Polyphaga
- Infraorder: Cucujiformia
- Family: Cerambycidae
- Genus: Phacellocerina
- Species: P. silvanae

Binomial name
- Phacellocerina silvanae Julio, 2003

Species of beetle

Phacellocerina silvanae is a species of beetle in the family Cerambycidae. It was described by Julio in 2003.
