= Caciomorpha robusta =

Scientific classification
- Kingdom: Animalia
- Phylum: Arthropoda
- Class: Insecta
- Order: Coleoptera
- Suborder: Polyphaga
- Infraorder: Cucujiformia
- Family: Cerambycidae
- Genus: Caciomorpha
- Species: C. robusta

Binomial name
- Caciomorpha robusta Galileo & Martins, 1998

Species of beetle

Caciomorpha robusta is a species of beetle in the family Cerambycidae. It was described by Galileo and Martins in 1998.
