= Parachalastinus nigrescens =

Scientific classification
- Kingdom: Animalia
- Phylum: Arthropoda
- Class: Insecta
- Order: Coleoptera
- Suborder: Polyphaga
- Infraorder: Cucujiformia
- Family: Cerambycidae
- Genus: Parachalastinus
- Species: P. nigrescens

Binomial name
- Parachalastinus nigrescens Galileo & Martins, 2001

Species of beetle

Parachalastinus nigrescens is a species of beetle in the family Cerambycidae. It was described by Galileo and Martins in 2001.
