= Caciomorpha plagiata =

Scientific classification
- Kingdom: Animalia
- Phylum: Arthropoda
- Class: Insecta
- Order: Coleoptera
- Suborder: Polyphaga
- Infraorder: Cucujiformia
- Family: Cerambycidae
- Genus: Caciomorpha
- Species: C. plagiata

Binomial name
- Caciomorpha plagiata Bates, 1875

Species of beetle

Caciomorpha plagiata is a species of beetle in the family Cerambycidae. It was described by Henry Walter Bates in 1875.
