= Eusthenomus wallisi =

Scientific classification
- Kingdom: Animalia
- Phylum: Arthropoda
- Class: Insecta
- Order: Coleoptera
- Suborder: Polyphaga
- Infraorder: Cucujiformia
- Family: Cerambycidae
- Genus: Eusthenomus
- Species: E. wallisi

Binomial name
- Eusthenomus wallisi Bates, 1875

Species of beetle

Eusthenomus wallisi is a species of beetle in the family Cerambycidae. It was described by Bates in 1875.
