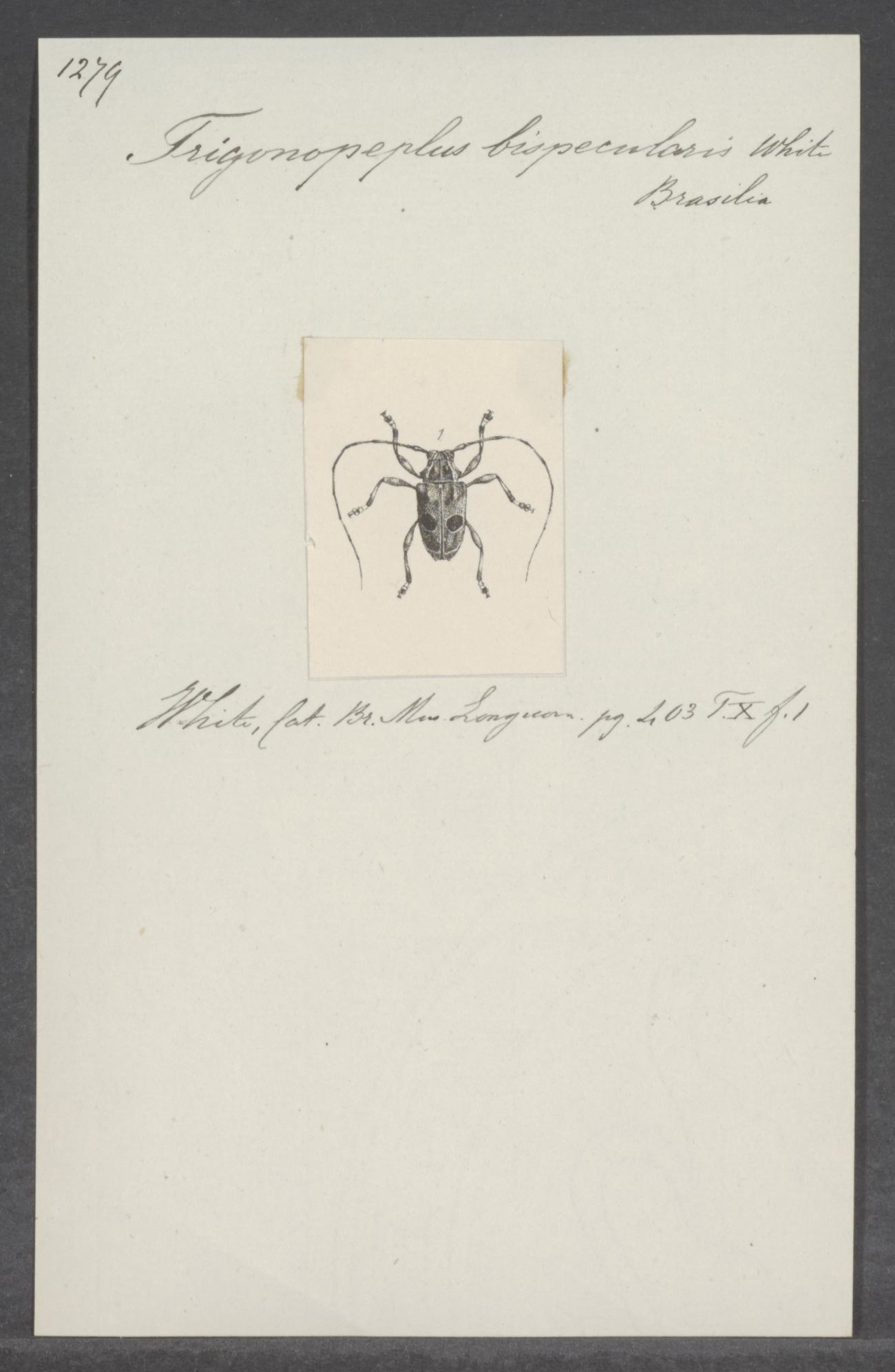

Scientific classification
- Kingdom: Animalia
- Phylum: Arthropoda
- Class: Insecta
- Order: Coleoptera
- Suborder: Polyphaga
- Infraorder: Cucujiformia
- Family: Cerambycidae
- Genus: Trigonopeplus
- Species: T. bispecularis

Binomial name
- Trigonopeplus bispecularis White, 1855

= Trigonopeplus bispecularis =

Species of beetle

Trigonopeplus bispecularis is a species of beetle in the family Cerambycidae. It was described by White in 1855.
