= Caciomorpha genalis =

Scientific classification
- Kingdom: Animalia
- Phylum: Arthropoda
- Class: Insecta
- Order: Coleoptera
- Suborder: Polyphaga
- Infraorder: Cucujiformia
- Family: Cerambycidae
- Genus: Caciomorpha
- Species: C. genalis

Binomial name
- Caciomorpha genalis Aurivillius, 1908

Species of beetle

Caciomorpha genalis is a species of beetle in the family Cerambycidae. It was described by Per Olof Christopher Aurivillius in 1908.
