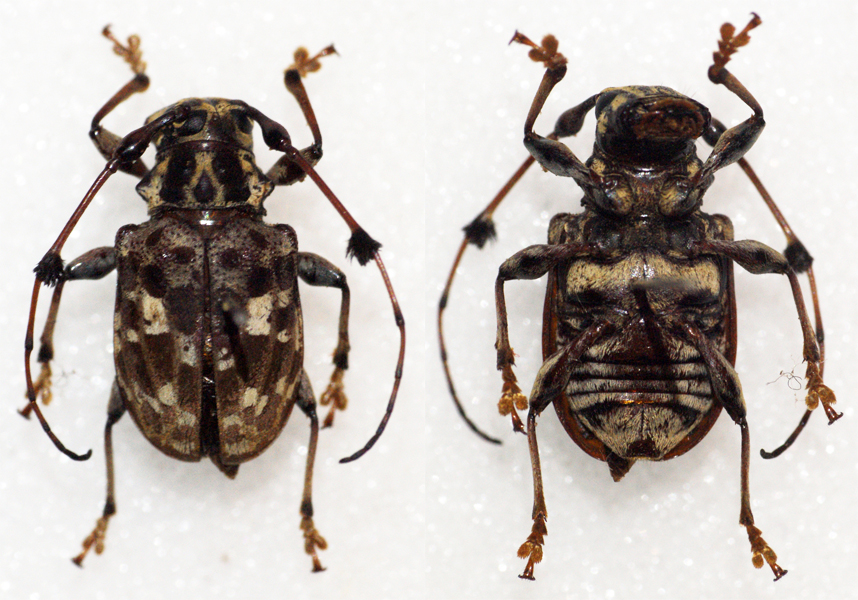
- Anisocerus stellatus

Scientific classification
- Kingdom: Animalia
- Phylum: Arthropoda
- Class: Insecta
- Order: Coleoptera
- Suborder: Polyphaga
- Infraorder: Cucujiformia
- Family: Cerambycidae
- Tribe: Anisocerini
- Genus: Anisocerus; Lepeletier & Audinet-Serville, 1830

= Anisocerus =

Genus of beetles

Anisocerus is a genus of long-horned beetles in the family Cerambycidae. There are at least two described species in Anisocerus.

== Species ==
These two species belong to the genus Anisocerus:

- Anisocerus scopifer (Germar, 1824)
- Anisocerus stellatus Guérin-Méneville, 1855
