= Caciomorpha batesi =

Scientific classification
- Kingdom: Animalia
- Phylum: Arthropoda
- Class: Insecta
- Order: Coleoptera
- Suborder: Polyphaga
- Infraorder: Cucujiformia
- Family: Cerambycidae
- Genus: Caciomorpha
- Species: C. batesi

Binomial name
- Caciomorpha batesi Pascoe, 1858

Species of beetle

Caciomorpha batesi is a species of beetle in the family Cerambycidae. It was described by Francis Polkinghorne Pascoe in 1858.
