= Phacellocerina limosa =

Scientific classification
- Domain: Eukaryota
- Kingdom: Animalia
- Phylum: Arthropoda
- Class: Insecta
- Order: Coleoptera
- Suborder: Polyphaga
- Infraorder: Cucujiformia
- Family: Cerambycidae
- Genus: Phacellocerina
- Species: P. limosa

Binomial name
- Phacellocerina limosa (Bates, 1862)

Species of beetle

Phacellocerina limosa is a species of beetle in the family Cerambycidae. It was described by noted English naturalist Henry Walter Bates in 1862. The species is native to South America, and has a distribution field encompassing Guyana and Venezuela. No subspecies of the beetle are known to exist, and no common name has entered the nomenclature since its discovery. Specimens of the insect are held in Paris in the National Museum of Natural History, where its distinctive pattern can be ascertained.
