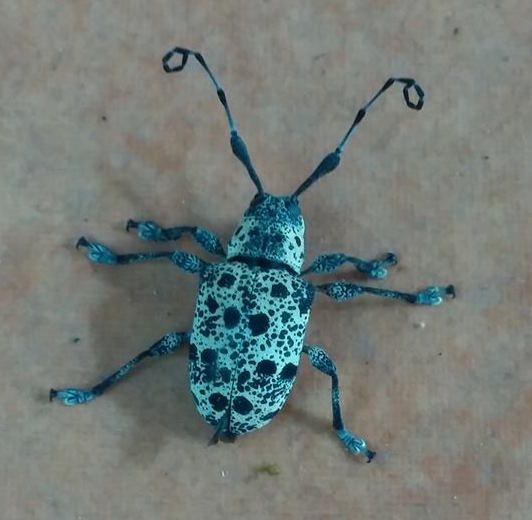
- Thryallis ocellatus

Scientific classification
- Domain: Eukaryota
- Kingdom: Animalia
- Phylum: Arthropoda
- Class: Insecta
- Order: Coleoptera
- Suborder: Polyphaga
- Infraorder: Cucujiformia
- Family: Cerambycidae
- Tribe: Anisocerini
- Genus: Thryallis

= Thryallis (beetle) =

Genus of beetles

Thryallis is a genus of beetles in the family Cerambycidae, containing the following species:

- Thryallis granulosus Bates, 1885
- Thryallis leucophaeus (White, 1855)
- Thryallis maculosus Thomson, 1858
- Thryallis noguerai Chemsak & McCarty, 1997
- Thryallis ocellatus Chemsak & McCarty, 1997
- Thryallis sallaei Bates, 1880
- Thryallis undatus (Chevrolat, 1834)
