= Caciomorpha buquetii =

Scientific classification
- Kingdom: Animalia
- Phylum: Arthropoda
- Class: Insecta
- Order: Coleoptera
- Suborder: Polyphaga
- Infraorder: Cucujiformia
- Family: Cerambycidae
- Genus: Caciomorpha
- Species: C. buquetii

Binomial name
- Caciomorpha buquetii Guérin-Méneville, 1844

Species of beetle

Caciomorpha buquetii is a species of beetle in the family Cerambycidae. It was described by Félix Édouard Guérin-Méneville in 1844.
