= Gounellea capucina =

Scientific classification
- Kingdom: Animalia
- Phylum: Arthropoda
- Class: Insecta
- Order: Coleoptera
- Suborder: Polyphaga
- Infraorder: Cucujiformia
- Family: Cerambycidae
- Genus: Gounellea
- Species: G. capucina

Binomial name
- Gounellea capucina (White, 1846)

Species of beetle

Gounellea capucina is a species of beetle in the family Cerambycidae. It was described by White in 1846.
