= Phacellocera =

Scientific classification
- Kingdom: Animalia
- Phylum: Arthropoda
- Class: Insecta
- Order: Coleoptera
- Suborder: Polyphaga
- Infraorder: Cucujiformia
- Family: Cerambycidae
- Tribe: Anisocerini
- Genus: Phacellocera; Laporte, 1840
- Species: P. plumicornis

Binomial name
- Phacellocera plumicornis (Klug, 1825)

Genus of beetles

Phacellocera is a monotypic genus of beetles in the family Cerambycidae described by Laporte in 1840. Its only species, Phacellocera plumicornis, was described by Johann Christoph Friedrich Klug in 1825.
