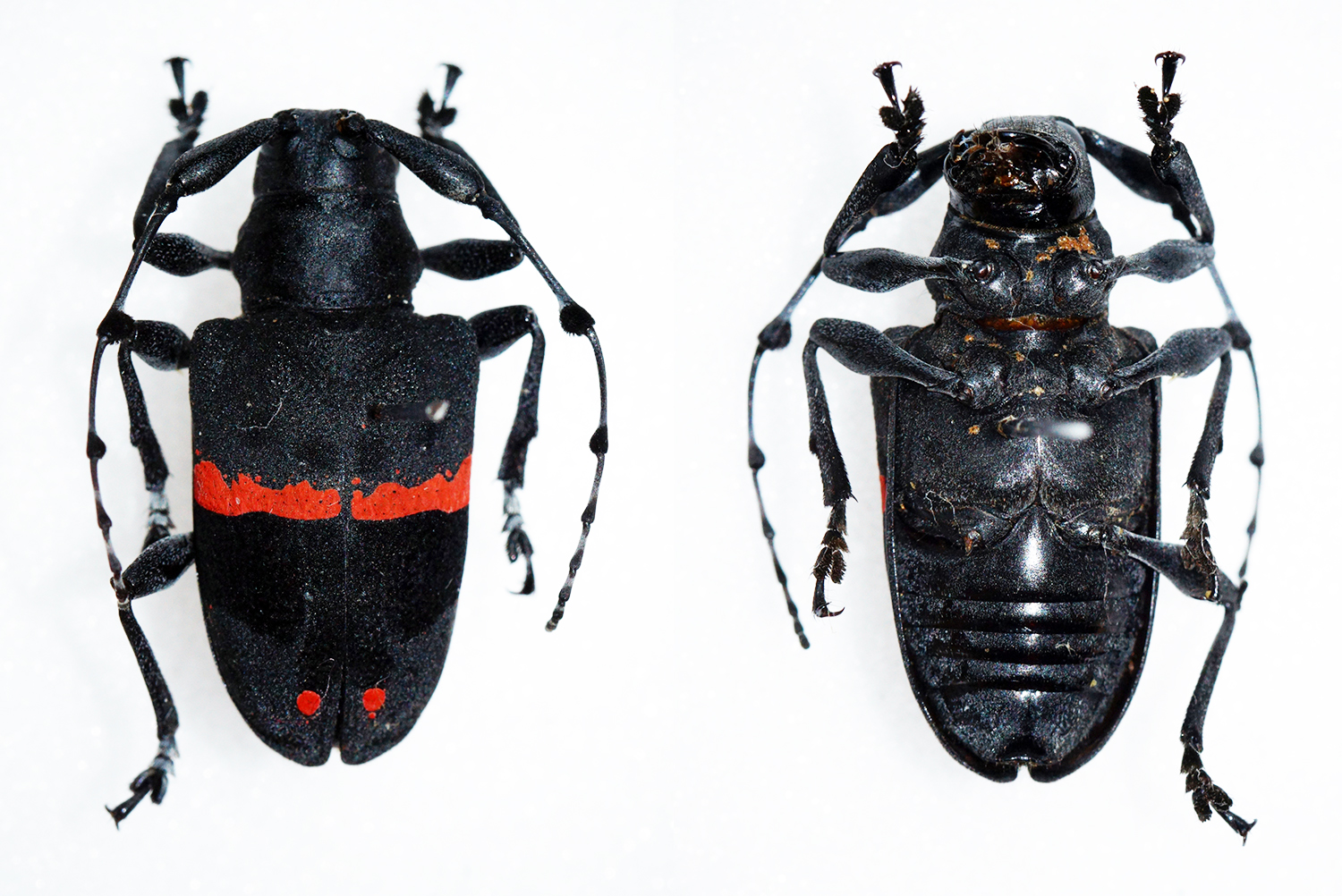

Scientific classification
- Kingdom: Animalia
- Phylum: Arthropoda
- Class: Insecta
- Order: Coleoptera
- Suborder: Polyphaga
- Infraorder: Cucujiformia
- Family: Cerambycidae
- Genus: Parachalastinus
- Species: P. rubrocinctus

Binomial name
- Parachalastinus rubrocinctus (Bates, 1869)

= Parachalastinus rubrocinctus =

Species of beetle

Parachalastinus rubrocinctus is a species of beetle in the family Cerambycidae. It was described by Bates in 1869.
