= Fredlanella cerussata =

Scientific classification
- Kingdom: Animalia
- Phylum: Arthropoda
- Class: Insecta
- Order: Coleoptera
- Suborder: Polyphaga
- Infraorder: Cucujiformia
- Family: Cerambycidae
- Genus: Fredlanella
- Species: F. cerussata

Binomial name
- Fredlanella cerussata (Lane, 1964)

Species of beetle

Fredlanella cerussata is a species of beetle in the family Cerambycidae. It was described by Lane in 1964.
