= Trigonopeplus binominis =

Scientific classification
- Kingdom: Animalia
- Phylum: Arthropoda
- Class: Insecta
- Order: Coleoptera
- Suborder: Polyphaga
- Infraorder: Cucujiformia
- Family: Cerambycidae
- Genus: Trigonopeplus
- Species: T. binominis

Binomial name
- Trigonopeplus binominis Chevrolat, 1861

Species of beetle

Trigonopeplus binominis is a species of beetle in the family Cerambycidae. It was described by Chevrolat in 1861.
