= Thryallis undatus =

Scientific classification
- Domain: Eukaryota
- Kingdom: Animalia
- Phylum: Arthropoda
- Class: Insecta
- Order: Coleoptera
- Suborder: Polyphaga
- Infraorder: Cucujiformia
- Family: Cerambycidae
- Genus: Thryallis
- Species: T. undatus

Binomial name
- Thryallis undatus (Chevrolat, 1834)

Species of beetle

Thryallis undatus is a species of beetle in the family Cerambycidae. It was described by Chevrolat in 1834.
