= Chalastinus pantherinus =

Scientific classification
- Kingdom: Animalia
- Phylum: Arthropoda
- Class: Insecta
- Order: Coleoptera
- Suborder: Polyphaga
- Infraorder: Cucujiformia
- Family: Cerambycidae
- Genus: Chalastinus
- Species: C. pantherinus

Binomial name
- Chalastinus pantherinus Lacordaire, 1872

Species of beetle

Chalastinus pantherinus is a species of beetle in the family Cerambycidae. It was described by Lacordaire in 1872.
