= Badenella fallaciosa =

Scientific classification
- Domain: Eukaryota
- Kingdom: Animalia
- Phylum: Arthropoda
- Class: Insecta
- Order: Coleoptera
- Suborder: Polyphaga
- Infraorder: Cucujiformia
- Family: Cerambycidae
- Genus: Badenella
- Species: B. fallaciosa

Binomial name
- Badenella fallaciosa Lane, 1964

Species of beetle

Badenella fallaciosa is a species of beetle in the family Cerambycidae. It was described by Lane in 1964.
