= Thryallis noguerai =

Scientific classification
- Domain: Eukaryota
- Kingdom: Animalia
- Phylum: Arthropoda
- Class: Insecta
- Order: Coleoptera
- Suborder: Polyphaga
- Infraorder: Cucujiformia
- Family: Cerambycidae
- Genus: Thryallis
- Species: T. noguerai

Binomial name
- Thryallis noguerai Chemsak & McCarty, 1997

Species of beetle

Thryallis noguerai is a species of beetle in the family Cerambycidae. It was described by Chemsak and McCarty in 1997.
