= Batesbeltia cerussata =

Scientific classification
- Kingdom: Animalia
- Phylum: Arthropoda
- Class: Insecta
- Order: Coleoptera
- Suborder: Polyphaga
- Infraorder: Cucujiformia
- Family: Cerambycidae
- Genus: Batesbeltia
- Species: B. cerussata

Binomial name
- Batesbeltia cerussata Lane, 1964

Species of beetle

Batesbeltia cerussata is a species of beetle in the family Cerambycidae. It was described by Lane in 1964.
