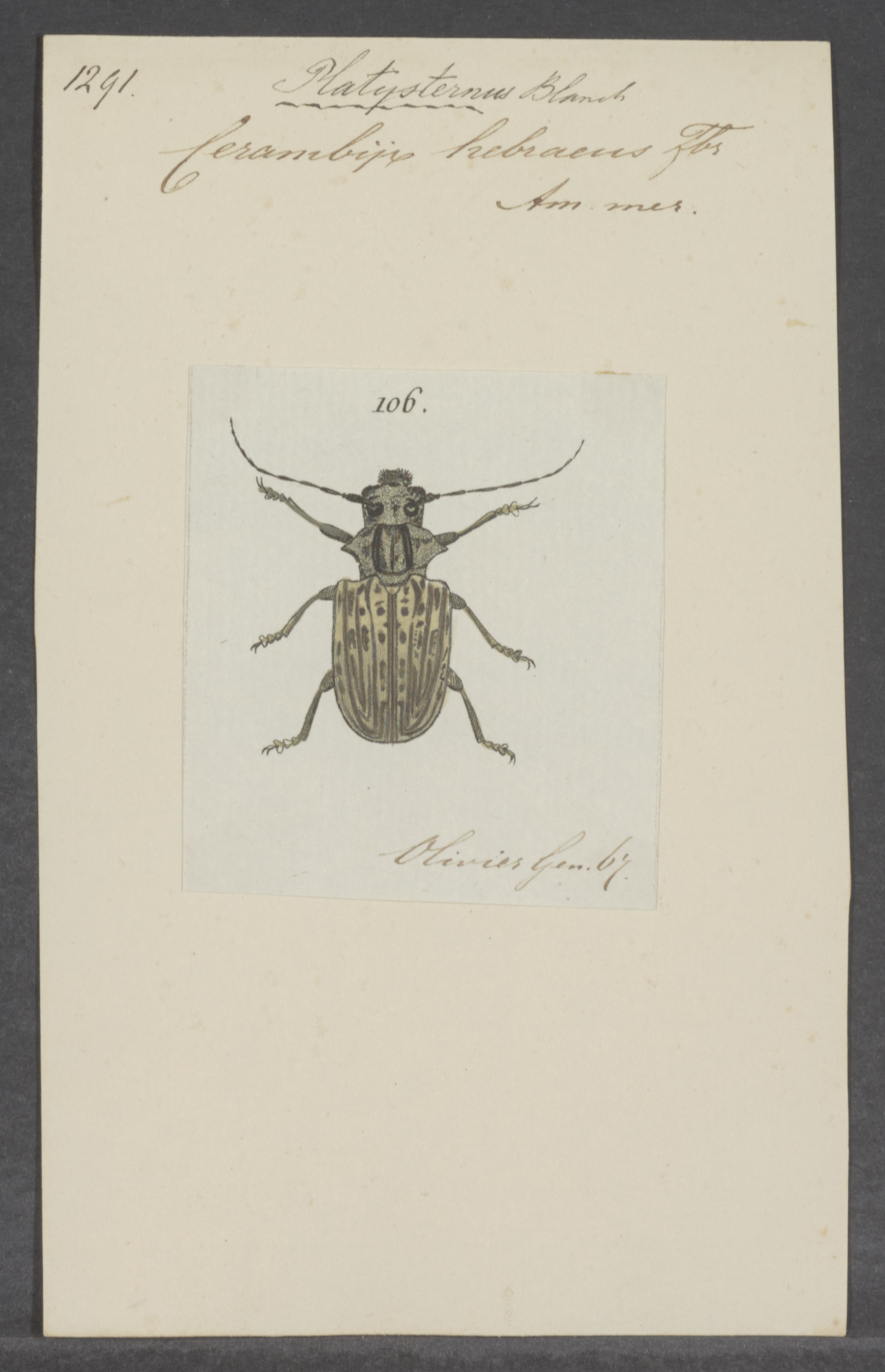

Scientific classification
- Kingdom: Animalia
- Phylum: Arthropoda
- Class: Insecta
- Order: Coleoptera
- Suborder: Polyphaga
- Infraorder: Cucujiformia
- Family: Cerambycidae
- Tribe: Anisocerini
- Genus: Platysternus; Dejean, 1835
- Species: P. hebraeus

Binomial name
- Platysternus hebraeus (Fabricius, 1781)

= Platysternus =

Genus of beetles

Platysternus is a monotypic beetle genus in the family Cerambycidae described by Pierre François Marie Auguste Dejean in 1835. Its only species, Platysternus hebraeus, was described by Johan Christian Fabricius in 1781.
