= Badenella =

Scientific classification
- Domain: Eukaryota
- Kingdom: Animalia
- Phylum: Arthropoda
- Class: Insecta
- Order: Coleoptera
- Suborder: Polyphaga
- Infraorder: Cucujiformia
- Family: Cerambycidae
- Tribe: Anisocerini
- Genus: Badenella

Genus of beetles

Badenella is a genus of beetles in the family Cerambycidae, containing the following species:

- Badenella badeni (Bates, 1875)
- Badenella fallaciosa Lane, 1964
- Badenella gavisa (Lane, 1966)
- Badenella ignota Lane, 1964
