= Satipoella bufo =

Scientific classification
- Kingdom: Animalia
- Phylum: Arthropoda
- Class: Insecta
- Order: Coleoptera
- Suborder: Polyphaga
- Infraorder: Cucujiformia
- Family: Cerambycidae
- Genus: Satipoella
- Species: S. bufo

Binomial name
- Satipoella bufo (Thomson, 1868)

Species of beetle

Satipoella bufo is a species of beetle in the family Cerambycidae. It was described by Thomson in 1868.
