= Badenella ignota =

Scientific classification
- Domain: Eukaryota
- Kingdom: Animalia
- Phylum: Arthropoda
- Class: Insecta
- Order: Coleoptera
- Suborder: Polyphaga
- Infraorder: Cucujiformia
- Family: Cerambycidae
- Genus: Badenella
- Species: B. ignota

Binomial name
- Badenella ignota Lane, 1964

Species of beetle

Badenella ignota is a species of beetle in the family Cerambycidae. It was described by Lane in 1964.
