= Parachalastinus flavescens =

Scientific classification
- Kingdom: Animalia
- Phylum: Arthropoda
- Class: Insecta
- Order: Coleoptera
- Suborder: Polyphaga
- Infraorder: Cucujiformia
- Family: Cerambycidae
- Genus: Parachalastinus
- Species: P. flavescens

Binomial name
- Parachalastinus flavescens Julio, 2005

Species of beetle

Parachalastinus flavescens is a species of beetle in the family Cerambycidae. It was described by Julio in 2005.
