= Xylotribus pinacopterus =

Scientific classification
- Kingdom: Animalia
- Phylum: Arthropoda
- Class: Insecta
- Order: Coleoptera
- Suborder: Polyphaga
- Infraorder: Cucujiformia
- Family: Cerambycidae
- Genus: Xylotribus
- Species: X. pinacopterus

Binomial name
- Xylotribus pinacopterus Lane, 1964

Species of beetle

Xylotribus pinacopterus is a species of beetle in the family Cerambycidae. It was described by Lane in 1964.
