= Gounellea bruchi =

Scientific classification
- Kingdom: Animalia
- Phylum: Arthropoda
- Class: Insecta
- Order: Coleoptera
- Suborder: Polyphaga
- Infraorder: Cucujiformia
- Family: Cerambycidae
- Genus: Gounellea
- Species: G. bruchi

Binomial name
- Gounellea bruchi (Gounelle, 1906)

Species of beetle

Gounellea bruchi is a species of beetle in the family Cerambycidae. It was described by Gounelle in 1906.
