= Caciomorpha =

Scientific classification
- Kingdom: Animalia
- Phylum: Arthropoda
- Class: Insecta
- Order: Coleoptera
- Suborder: Polyphaga
- Infraorder: Cucujiformia
- Family: Cerambycidae
- Subfamily: Lamiinae
- Tribe: Anisocerini
- Genus: Caciomorpha; Thomson, 1864

Genus of beetles

Caciomorpha is a genus of beetles in the family Cerambycidae that includes the following species:

- Caciomorpha batesi Pascoe, 1858
- Caciomorpha buquetii Guérin-Méneville, 1844
- Caciomorpha genalis Aurivillius, 1908
- Caciomorpha palliata (White, 1855)
- Caciomorpha plagiata Bates, 1875
- Caciomorpha robusta Galileo & Martins, 1998
- Caciomorpha susua (Martins & Galileo, 1996)
