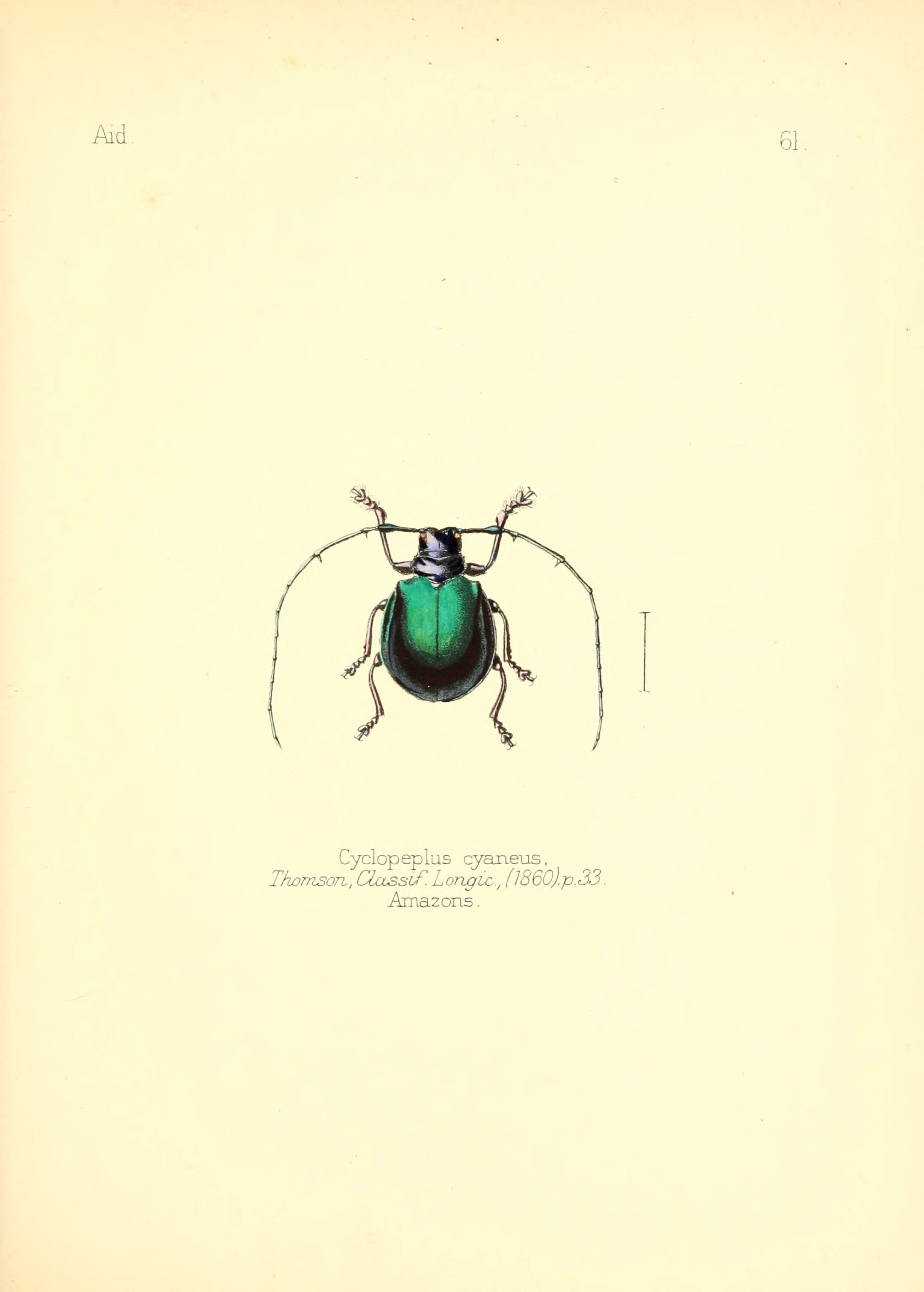
- Cyclopeplus cyaneus

Scientific classification
- Domain: Eukaryota
- Kingdom: Animalia
- Phylum: Arthropoda
- Class: Insecta
- Order: Coleoptera
- Suborder: Polyphaga
- Infraorder: Cucujiformia
- Family: Cerambycidae
- Tribe: Anisocerini
- Genus: Cyclopeplus

= Cyclopeplus =

Genus of beetles

Cyclopeplus is a genus of beetles in the family Cerambycidae, containing the following species:

- Cyclopeplus batesi Thomson, 1861
- Cyclopeplus castaneus Gounelle, 1906
- Cyclopeplus cyaneus Thomson, 1861
- Cyclopeplus lacordairei Thomson, 1868
- Cyclopeplus peruvianus Tippmann, 1939
