= Eusthenomus =

Scientific classification
- Kingdom: Animalia
- Phylum: Arthropoda
- Class: Insecta
- Order: Coleoptera
- Suborder: Polyphaga
- Infraorder: Cucujiformia
- Family: Cerambycidae
- Tribe: Anisocerini
- Genus: Eusthenomus

Genus of beetles

Eusthenomus is a genus of beetles in the family Cerambycidae, containing the following species:

- Eusthenomus hopei Lane, 1970
- Eusthenomus laceyi Lane, 1970
- Eusthenomus wallisi Bates, 1875
