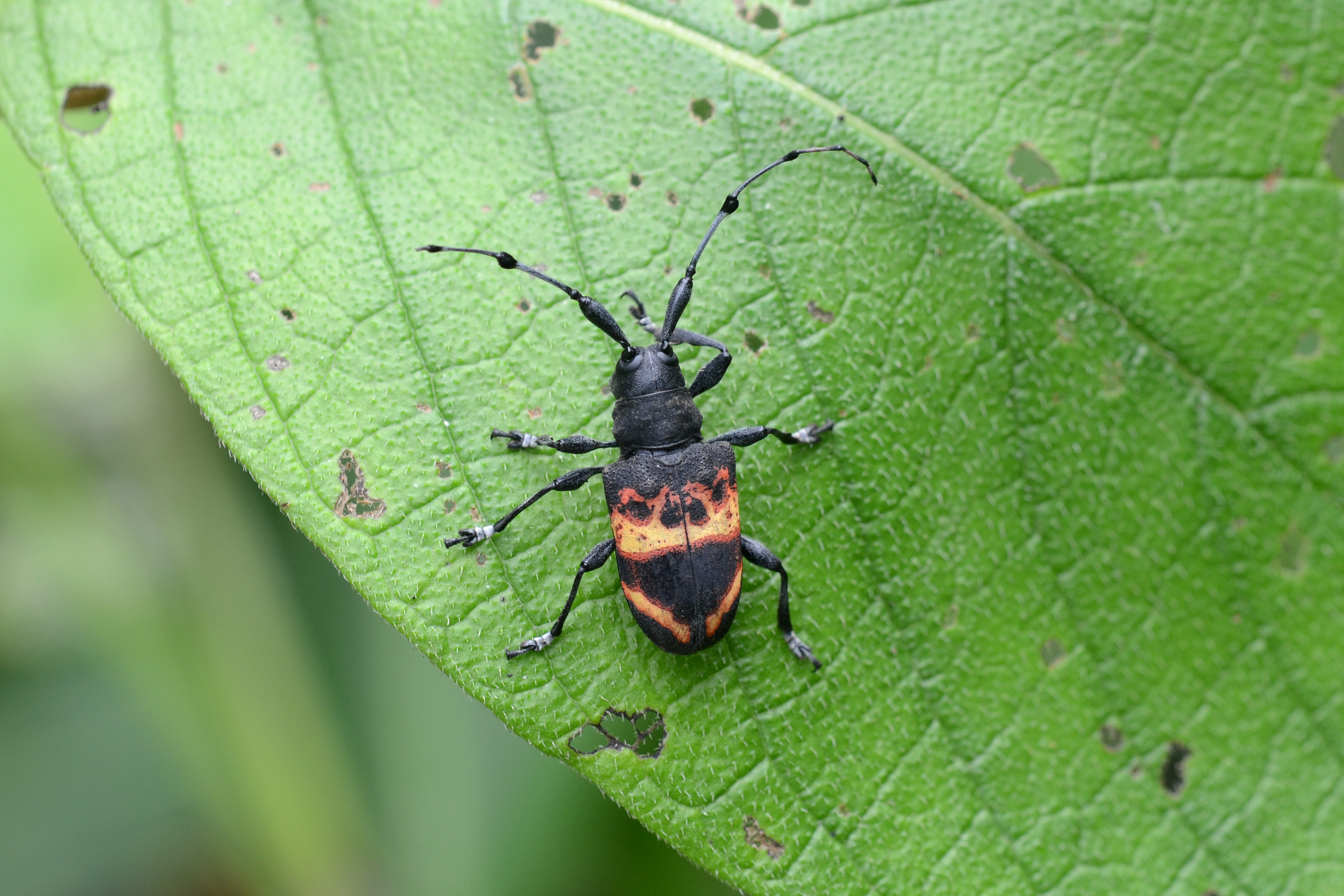
- Parachalastinus championi

Scientific classification
- Kingdom: Animalia
- Phylum: Arthropoda
- Class: Insecta
- Order: Coleoptera
- Suborder: Polyphaga
- Infraorder: Cucujiformia
- Family: Cerambycidae
- Subfamily: Lamiinae
- Tribe: Anisocerini
- Genus: Parachalastinus; Galileo & Martins, 2001

= Parachalastinus =

Genus of beetles

Parachalastinus is a genus of beetles in the family Cerambycidae, containing the following species:

- Parachalastinus championi (Bates, 1885)
- Parachalastinus flavescens Julio, 2005
- Parachalastinus nigrescens Galileo & Martins, 2001
- Parachalastinus rubrocinctus (Bates, 1869)
