= Gounellea =

Scientific classification
- Kingdom: Animalia
- Phylum: Arthropoda
- Class: Insecta
- Order: Coleoptera
- Suborder: Polyphaga
- Infraorder: Cucujiformia
- Family: Cerambycidae
- Subfamily: Lamiinae
- Tribe: Anisocerini
- Genus: Gounellea; Lane, 1964

Genus of beetles

Gounellea is a genus of beetles in the family Cerambycidae, containing the following species:

- Gounellea bruchi (Gounelle, 1906)
- Gounellea capucina (White, 1846)
- Gounellea dulcissima (White, 1855)
- Gounellea histrio (Gounelle, 1906)
