= Satipoella heilipoides =

Scientific classification
- Kingdom: Animalia
- Phylum: Arthropoda
- Class: Insecta
- Order: Coleoptera
- Suborder: Polyphaga
- Infraorder: Cucujiformia
- Family: Cerambycidae
- Genus: Satipoella
- Species: S. heilipoides

Binomial name
- Satipoella heilipoides Lane, 1964

Species of beetle

Satipoella heilipoides is a species of beetle in the family Cerambycidae. It was described by Lane in 1964.
