= Gounellea dulcissima =

Scientific classification
- Kingdom: Animalia
- Phylum: Arthropoda
- Class: Insecta
- Order: Coleoptera
- Suborder: Polyphaga
- Infraorder: Cucujiformia
- Family: Cerambycidae
- Genus: Gounellea
- Species: G. dulcissima

Binomial name
- Gounellea dulcissima (White, 1855)

Species of beetle

Gounellea dulcissima is a species of beetle in the family Cerambycidae. It was described by White in 1855.
