= Thryallis sallaei =

Scientific classification
- Domain: Eukaryota
- Kingdom: Animalia
- Phylum: Arthropoda
- Class: Insecta
- Order: Coleoptera
- Suborder: Polyphaga
- Infraorder: Cucujiformia
- Family: Cerambycidae
- Genus: Thryallis
- Species: T. sallaei

Binomial name
- Thryallis sallaei Bates, 1880

Species of beetle

Thryallis sallaei is a species of beetle in the family Cerambycidae. It was described by Bates in 1880.
