= Fredlanella =

Scientific classification
- Kingdom: Animalia
- Phylum: Arthropoda
- Class: Insecta
- Order: Coleoptera
- Suborder: Polyphaga
- Infraorder: Cucujiformia
- Family: Cerambycidae
- Tribe: Anisocerini
- Genus: Fredlanella

Genus of beetles

Fredlanella is a genus of beetles in the family Cerambycidae, containing the following species:

- Fredlanella cerussata (Lane, 1964)
- Fredlanella diringshofeni (Lane, 1972)
