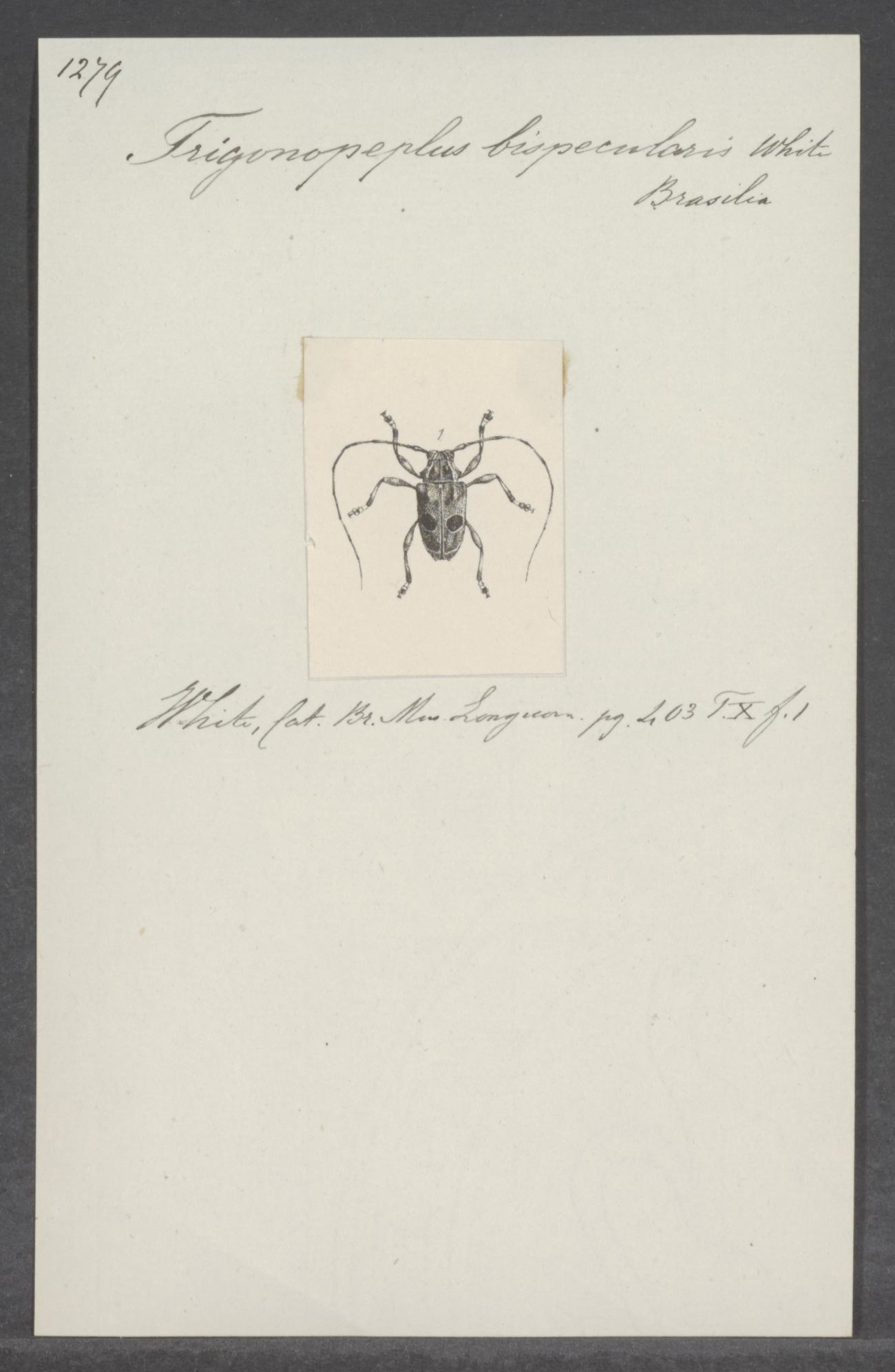
- Trigonopeplus bispecularis

Scientific classification
- Kingdom: Animalia
- Phylum: Arthropoda
- Class: Insecta
- Order: Coleoptera
- Suborder: Polyphaga
- Infraorder: Cucujiformia
- Family: Cerambycidae
- Subfamily: Lamiinae
- Tribe: Anisocerini
- Genus: Trigonopeplus; White, 1855

= Trigonopeplus =

Genus of beetles

Trigonopeplus is a genus of beetles in the family Cerambycidae, containing the following species:

- Trigonopeplus abdominalis White, 1855
- Trigonopeplus binominis Chevrolat, 1861
- Trigonopeplus bispecularis White, 1855
- Trigonopeplus paterculus Lacordaire, 1872
