= Trigonopeplus paterculus =

Scientific classification
- Kingdom: Animalia
- Phylum: Arthropoda
- Class: Insecta
- Order: Coleoptera
- Suborder: Polyphaga
- Infraorder: Cucujiformia
- Family: Cerambycidae
- Genus: Trigonopeplus
- Species: T. paterculus

Binomial name
- Trigonopeplus paterculus Lacordaire, 1872

Species of beetle

Trigonopeplus paterculus is a species of beetle in the family Cerambycidae. It was described by Lacordaire in 1872.
