= Badenella gavisa =

Scientific classification
- Domain: Eukaryota
- Kingdom: Animalia
- Phylum: Arthropoda
- Class: Insecta
- Order: Coleoptera
- Suborder: Polyphaga
- Infraorder: Cucujiformia
- Family: Cerambycidae
- Genus: Badenella
- Species: B. gavisa

Binomial name
- Badenella gavisa (Lane, 1966)

Species of beetle

Badenella gavisa is a species of beetle in the family Cerambycidae. It was described by Lane in 1966.
