= Batesbeltia pullata =

Scientific classification
- Kingdom: Animalia
- Phylum: Arthropoda
- Class: Insecta
- Order: Coleoptera
- Suborder: Polyphaga
- Infraorder: Cucujiformia
- Family: Cerambycidae
- Genus: Batesbeltia
- Species: B. pullata

Binomial name
- Batesbeltia pullata Lane, 1964

Species of beetle

Batesbeltia pullata is a species of beetle in the family Cerambycidae. It was described by Lane in 1964.
