= Phacellocerina =

Scientific classification
- Domain: Eukaryota
- Kingdom: Animalia
- Phylum: Arthropoda
- Class: Insecta
- Order: Coleoptera
- Suborder: Polyphaga
- Infraorder: Cucujiformia
- Family: Cerambycidae
- Tribe: Anisocerini
- Genus: Phacellocerina

Genus of beetles

Phacellocerina is a genus of beetles in the family Cerambycidae, containing the following species:

- Phacellocerina limosa (Bates, 1862)
- Phacellocerina seclusa Lane, 1964
- Phacellocerina silvanae Julio, 2003
