= Badenella badeni =

Scientific classification
- Kingdom: Animalia
- Phylum: Arthropoda
- Class: Insecta
- Order: Coleoptera
- Suborder: Polyphaga
- Infraorder: Cucujiformia
- Family: Cerambycidae
- Genus: Badenella
- Species: B. badeni

Binomial name
- Badenella badeni (Bates, 1875)

Species of beetle

Badenella badeni is a species of beetle in the family Cerambycidae. It was described by Bates in 1875.
