= Satipoella ochroma =

Scientific classification
- Kingdom: Animalia
- Phylum: Arthropoda
- Class: Insecta
- Order: Coleoptera
- Suborder: Polyphaga
- Infraorder: Cucujiformia
- Family: Cerambycidae
- Genus: Satipoella
- Species: S. ochroma

Binomial name
- Satipoella ochroma Julio, 2003

Species of beetle

Satipoella ochroma is a species of beetle in the family Cerambycidae. It was described by Julio in 2003.
