= Cyclopeplus lacordairei =

Scientific classification
- Domain: Eukaryota
- Kingdom: Animalia
- Phylum: Arthropoda
- Class: Insecta
- Order: Coleoptera
- Suborder: Polyphaga
- Infraorder: Cucujiformia
- Family: Cerambycidae
- Genus: Cyclopeplus
- Species: C. lacordairei

Binomial name
- Cyclopeplus lacordairei Thomson, 1868

Species of beetle

Cyclopeplus lacordairei is a species of beetle in the family Cerambycidae. It was described by Thomson in 1868.
