= Demophoo =

Scientific classification
- Kingdom: Animalia
- Phylum: Arthropoda
- Class: Insecta
- Order: Coleoptera
- Suborder: Polyphaga
- Infraorder: Cucujiformia
- Family: Cerambycidae
- Genus: Demophoo
- Species: D. hammatus

Binomial name
- Demophoo hammatus (Chabrillac, 1857)

Genus of beetles

Demophoo hammatus is a species of beetle in the family Cerambycidae, and the only species in the genus Demophoo. It was described by Chabrillac in 1857.
