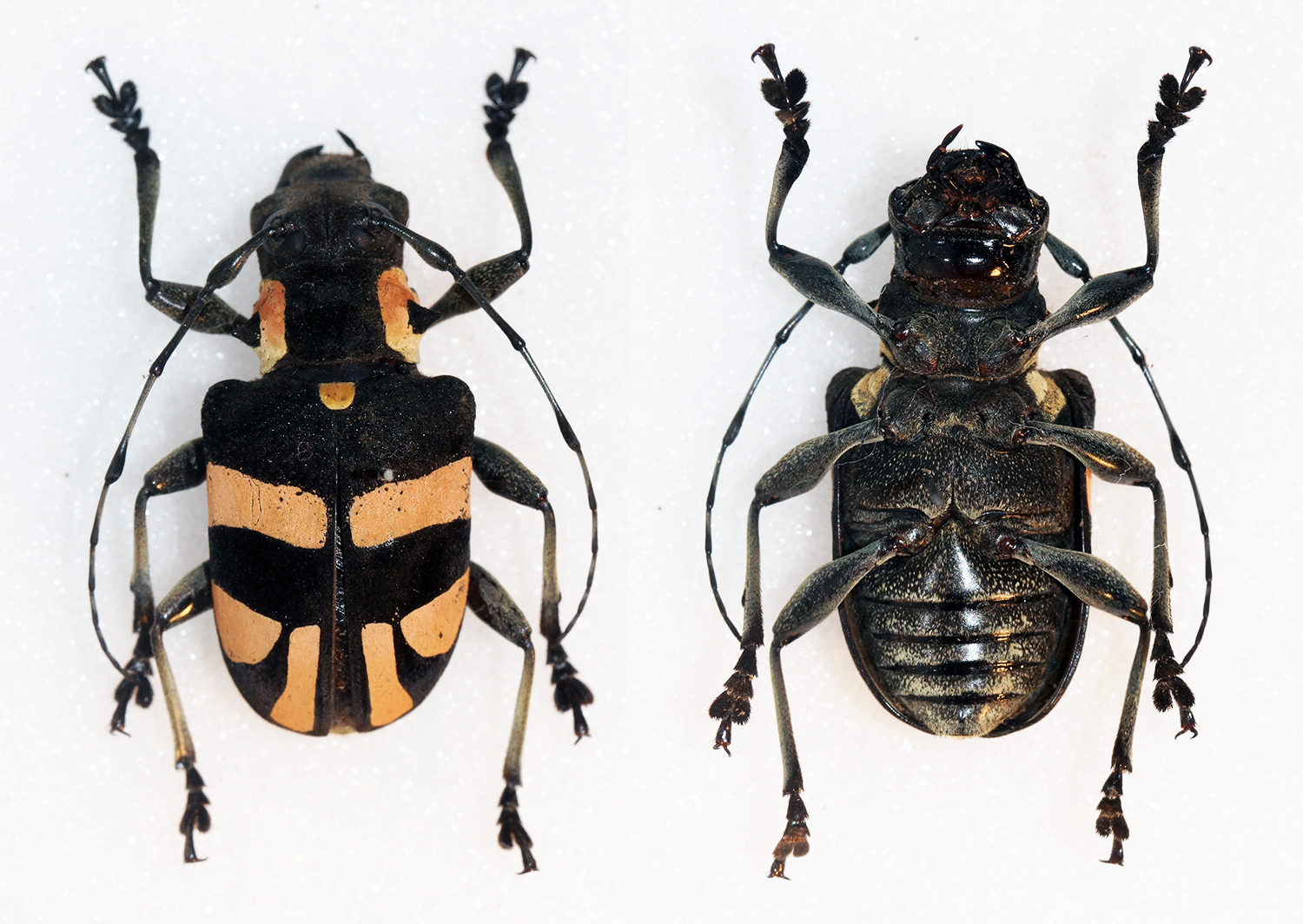

Scientific classification
- Kingdom: Animalia
- Phylum: Arthropoda
- Class: Insecta
- Order: Coleoptera
- Suborder: Polyphaga
- Infraorder: Cucujiformia
- Family: Cerambycidae
- Genus: Jurua
- Species: J. monachina

Binomial name
- Jurua monachina (White, 1855)

= Jurua =

Genus of beetles

Jurua monachina is a species of beetle in the family Cerambycidae, and the only species in the genus Jurua. It was described by White in 1855.
