= Chapareia =

Scientific classification
- Kingdom: Animalia
- Phylum: Arthropoda
- Class: Insecta
- Order: Coleoptera
- Suborder: Polyphaga
- Infraorder: Cucujiformia
- Family: Cerambycidae
- Genus: Chapareia
- Species: C. pinima

Binomial name
- Chapareia pinima Lane, 1950

Genus of beetles

Chapareia pinima is a species of beetle in the family Cerambycidae, and the only species in the genus Chapareia. It was described by Lane in 1950.
