= Gymnocerina =

Scientific classification
- Kingdom: Animalia
- Phylum: Arthropoda
- Class: Insecta
- Order: Coleoptera
- Suborder: Polyphaga
- Infraorder: Cucujiformia
- Family: Cerambycidae
- Genus: Gymnocerina
- Species: G. cratosomoides

Binomial name
- Gymnocerina cratosomoides (Bates, 1862)

Genus of beetles

Gymnocerina cratosomoides is a species of beetle in the family Cerambycidae, and the only species in the genus Gymnocerina. It was described by Bates in 1862.
