= Batesbeltia =

Scientific classification
- Missing taxonomy template (fix): Batesbeltia

Genus of beetles

Batesbeltia is a genus of beetles in the family Cerambycidae, containing the following species:

- Batesbeltia beltii (Bates, 1872)
- Batesbeltia cerussata Lane, 1964
- Batesbeltia pantherina Lane, 1964
- Batesbeltia pullata Lane, 1964
- Batesbeltia verecunda Lane, 1964
