= Homoephloeus =

Scientific classification
- Kingdom: Animalia
- Phylum: Arthropoda
- Class: Insecta
- Order: Coleoptera
- Suborder: Polyphaga
- Infraorder: Cucujiformia
- Family: Cerambycidae
- Genus: Homoephloeus
- Species: H. licheneus

Binomial name
- Homoephloeus licheneus Gahan, 1892

Genus of beetles

Homoephloeus licheneus is a species of beetle in the family Cerambycidae, and the only species in the genus Homoephloeus. It was described by Gahan in 1892.
