= Gymnocerus =

Scientific classification
- Kingdom: Animalia
- Phylum: Arthropoda
- Class: Insecta
- Order: Coleoptera
- Suborder: Polyphaga
- Infraorder: Cucujiformia
- Family: Cerambycidae
- Genus: Gymnocerus
- Species: G. scabripennis

Binomial name
- Gymnocerus scabripennis Audinet-Serville, 1835

Genus of beetles

Gymnocerus scabripennis is a species of beetle in the family Cerambycidae, and the only species in the genus Gymnocerus. It was described by Audinet-Serville in 1835.
