= Pristimantis orphnolaimus =

Conservation status
- Least Concern (IUCN 3.1)

Scientific classification
- Kingdom: Animalia
- Phylum: Chordata
- Class: Amphibia
- Order: Anura
- Clade: Brachycephaloidea
- Family: Craugastoridae
- Genus: Pristimantis
- Species: P. orphnolaimus

Binomial name
- Pristimantis orphnolaimus (Lynch, 1970)

Synonyms
- Eleutherodactylus orphnolaimus Lynch, 1970

Species of frog

Pristimantis orphnolaimus is a species of frog in the family Strabomantidae. It is endemic to eastern Ecuador. It is sometimes known as the Lago Agrio robber frog, after its type locality, Lago Agrio. It is threatened by habitat loss.

== Description ==
Male Pristimantis orphnolaimus are about 24 mm (0.94 in) in snout–vent length and females 25–34 mm (0.98–1.34 in). It has a characteristic, elongated conical tubercle on the eyelid.

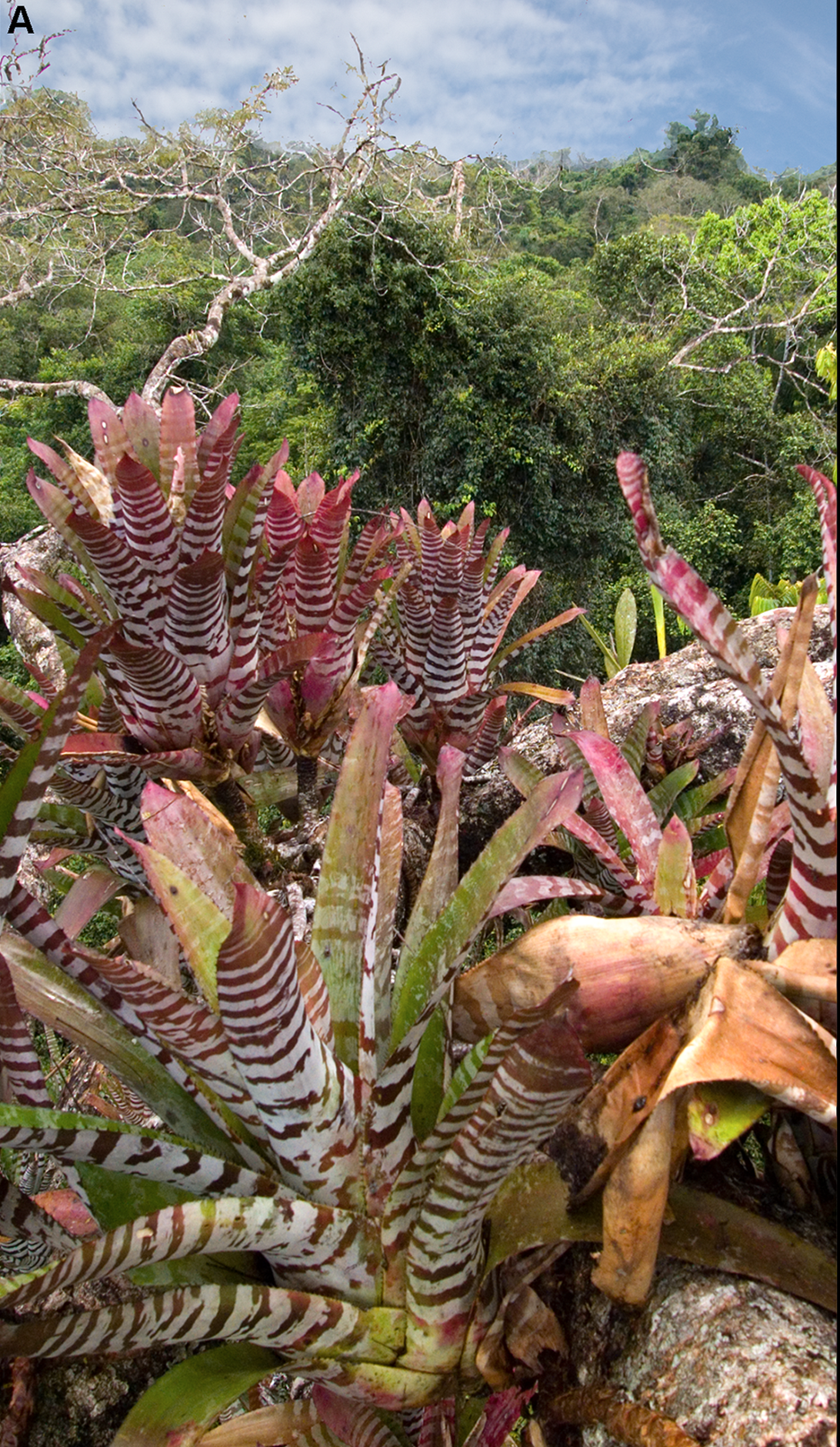
Arboreal habitat of Pristimantis orphnolaimus with epiphytic bromeliad Aechmea zebrina.

== Habitat and ecology ==
Its natural habitats are Napo moist forests in the eastern lowlands of Ecuador (250–350 m (820–1,150 ft) asl). It is an arboreal frog living up to 30 meters above ground at the base of bromeliads. As an arboreal species it is difficult to observe, and little is known about this species. Sampling of 16 trees with the upper canopy tank bromeliad Aechmea zebrina in undisturbed primary rainforest in the Orellana Province yielded two Pristimantis orphnolaimus specimens, whereas sampling of the same number of trees along oil access roads yielded none.
