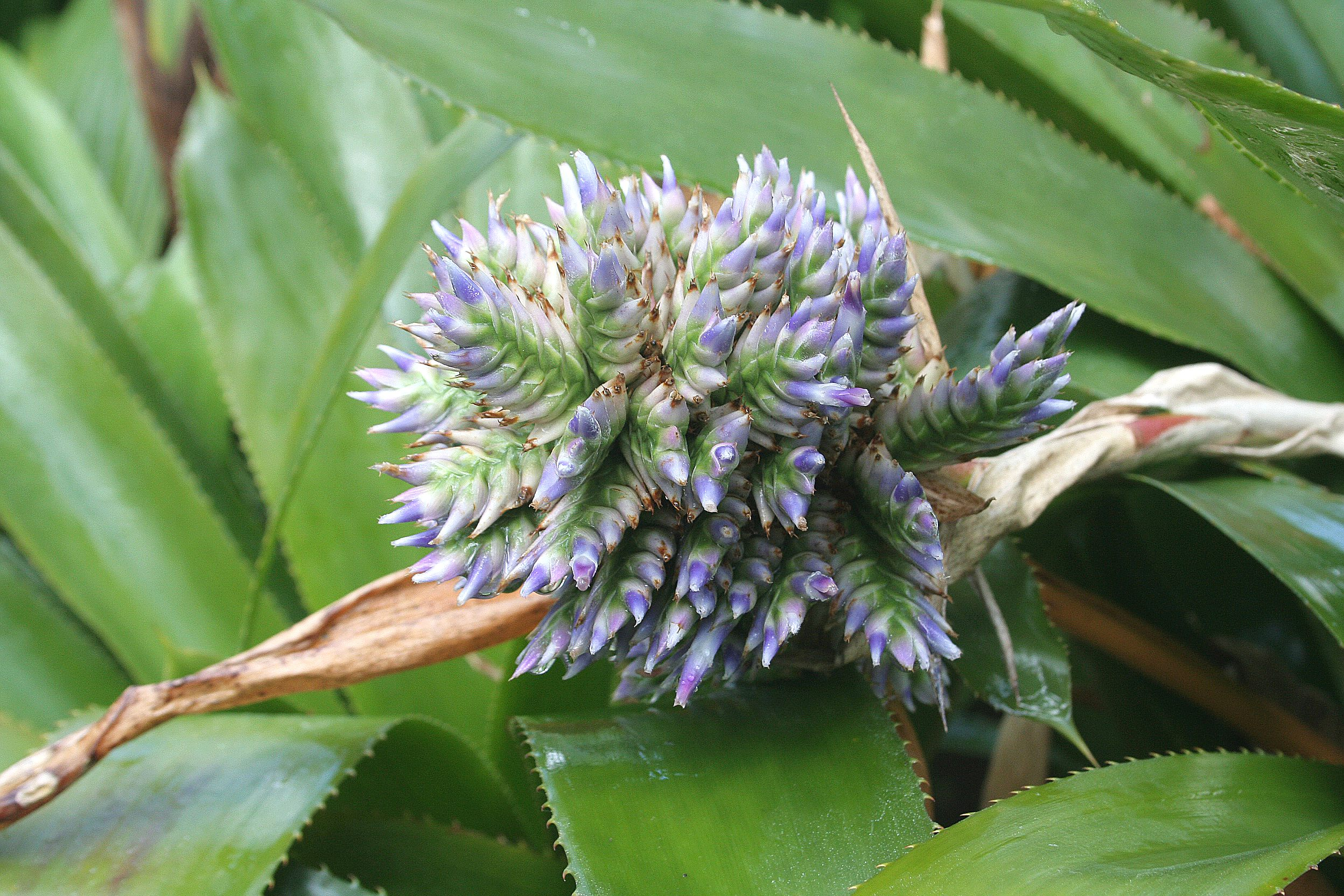

Scientific classification
- Kingdom: Plantae
- Clade: Tracheophytes
- Clade: Angiosperms
- Clade: Monocots
- Clade: Commelinids
- Order: Poales
- Family: Bromeliaceae
- Genus: Aechmea
- Subgenus: Aechmea subg. Platyaechmea
- Species: A. serrata

Binomial name
- Aechmea serrata (Linnaeus) Mez

Synonyms
- Tillandsia serrata L.; Tillandsia maxima Fox-Strangw.; Caraguata serrata (L.) Schult. & Schult.f.; Platystachys plumieri Beer, illegitimate; Platyaechmea serrata (L.) L.B.Sm. & W.J.Kress; Aechmea martinicensis Baker

= Aechmea serrata =

Species of flowering plant

Aechmea serrata is a plant species in the genus Aechmea. It was reportedly originally from Martinique in the West Indies, but now extinct in the wild. It does survive as a cultivated ornamental.

== Cultivars ==
Cultivars include:

- Aechmea 'Eileen'
- Aechmea 'Henrietta'
- × Anamea 'Raspberry Ice'
