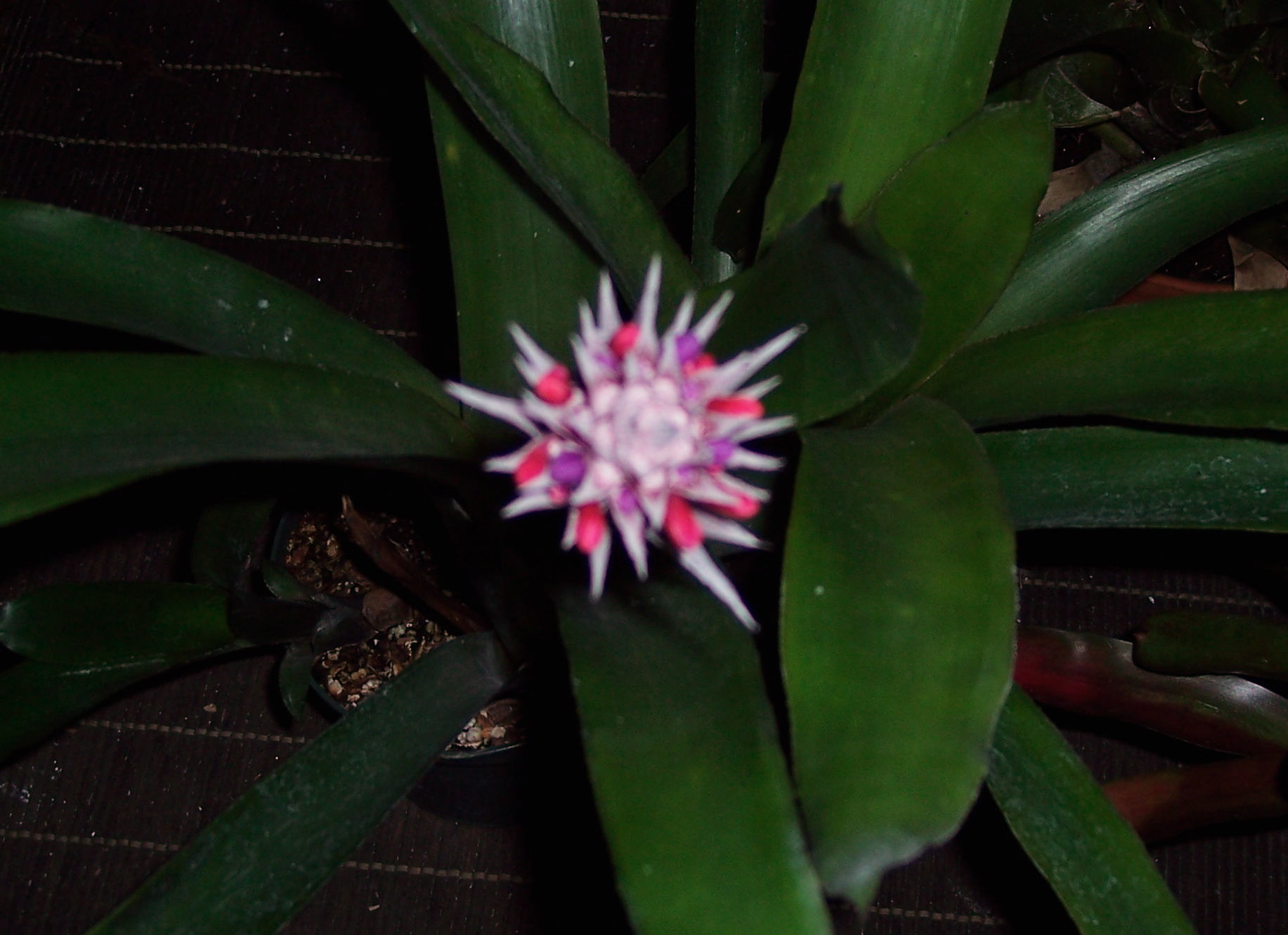

Scientific classification
- Kingdom: Plantae
- Clade: Tracheophytes
- Clade: Angiosperms
- Clade: Monocots
- Clade: Commelinids
- Order: Poales
- Family: Bromeliaceae
- Genus: Aechmea
- Subgenus: Aechmea subg. Platyaechmea
- Species: A. dealbata

Binomial name
- Aechmea dealbata E.Morren ex Baker

Synonyms
- Platyaechmea dealbata (E.Morren ex Baker) L.B.Sm. & W.J.Kress; Hoplophytum dealbatum E.Morren ex Baker

= Aechmea dealbata =

Species of epiphyte

Aechmea dealbata is a bromeliad in the subfamily Bromelioideae. This plant species has spiny green foliage with a complex pink and purple inflorescence. It is epiphytic but will grow in soil and is commonly cultivated. This species is endemic to the State of Rio de Janeiro in Brazil.

== Cultivars ==
- Aechmea 'Bill Hobbs'
- Aechmea 'Electrica (Electra)'
- Aechmea 'Fireman Sam'
- Aechmea 'Margarita L.'
- Aechmea 'Morris Henry Hobbs'
- Aechmea 'Ralph Davis'
