= Aechmea cucullata =

Scientific classification
- Kingdom: Plantae
- Clade: Tracheophytes
- Clade: Angiosperms
- Clade: Monocots
- Clade: Commelinids
- Order: Poales
- Family: Bromeliaceae
- Genus: Aechmea
- Subgenus: Aechmea subg. Platyaechmea
- Species: A. cucullata

Binomial name
- Aechmea cucullata H.Luther

Species of flowering plant

Aechmea cucullata is a plant species in the genus Aechmea. This species is native to Colombia and Ecuador.

== Cultivars ==
- Aechmea 'Orange River'
