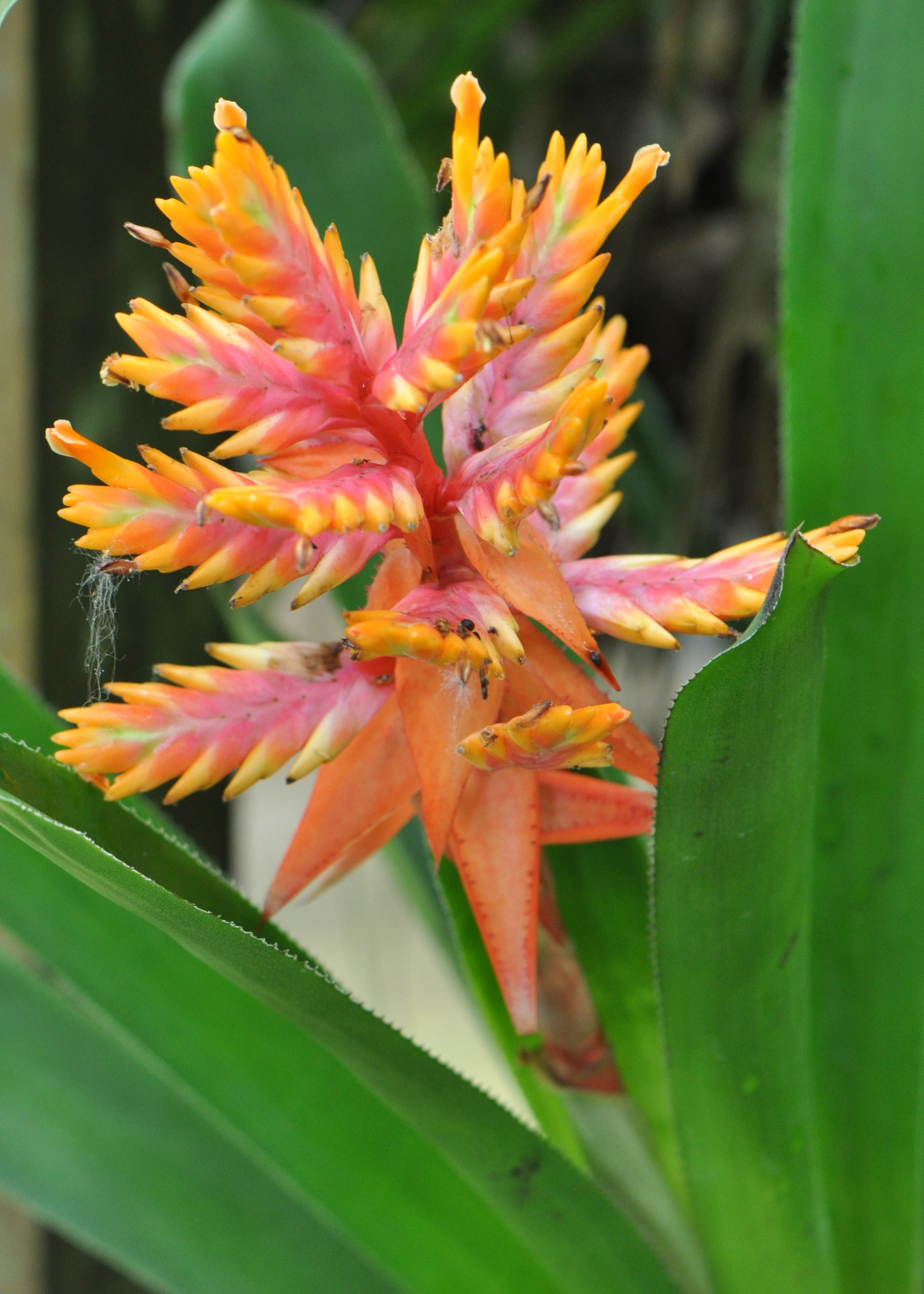

Conservation status
- Endangered (IUCN 3.1)

Scientific classification
- Kingdom: Plantae
- Clade: Tracheophytes
- Clade: Angiosperms
- Clade: Monocots
- Clade: Commelinids
- Order: Poales
- Family: Bromeliaceae
- Genus: Aechmea
- Subgenus: Aechmea subg. Platyaechmea
- Species: A. manzanaresiana

Binomial name
- Aechmea manzanaresiana H.Luther

= Aechmea manzanaresiana =

Species of flowering plant

Aechmea manzanaresiana is a species of plant in the family Bromeliaceae. It is endemic to Ecuador. Its natural habitat is subtropical or tropical moist montane forests. It is threatened by habitat loss.

Aechmea 'Fire' is a cultivar of the species.
