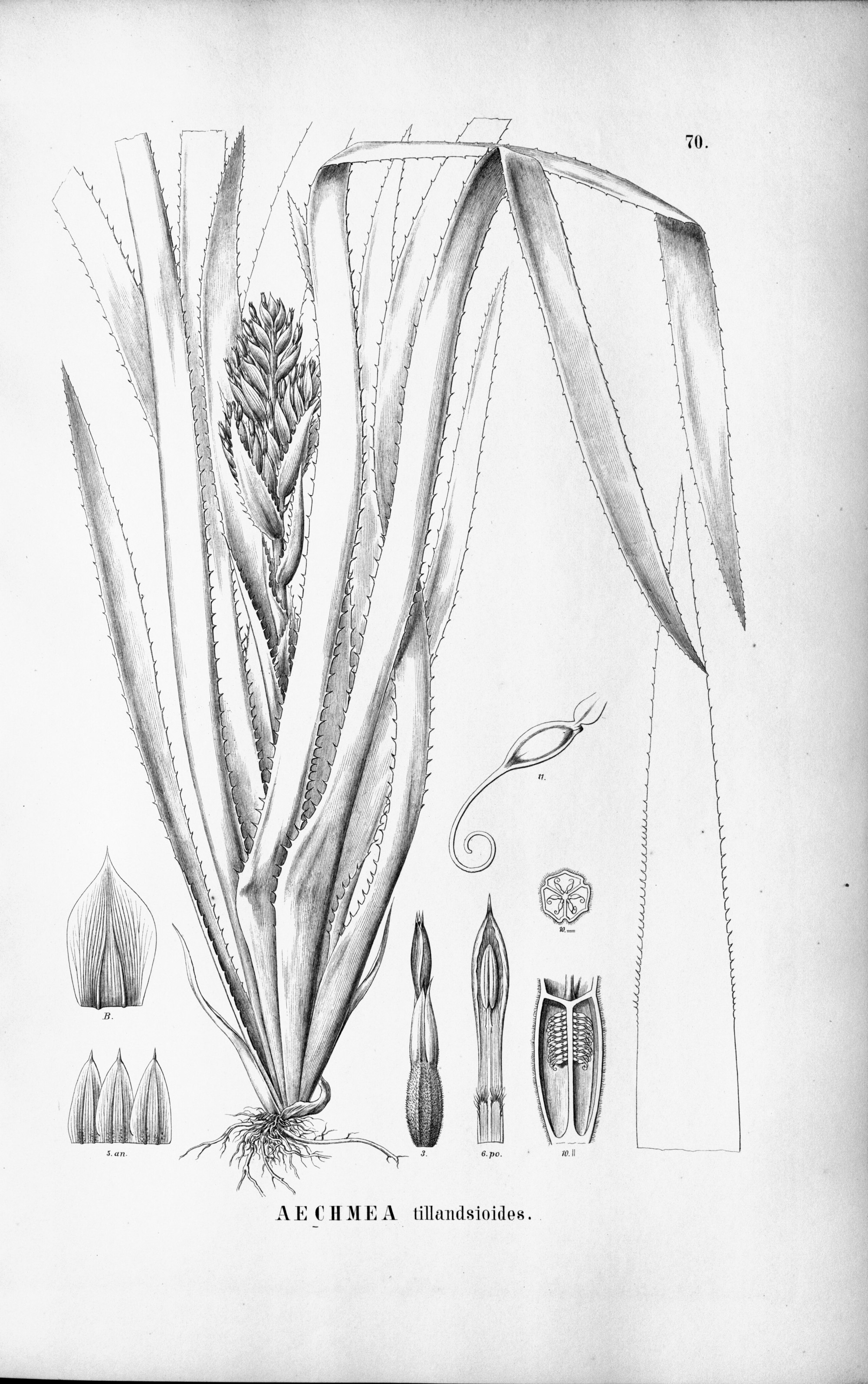
- illustration circa 1900

Scientific classification
- Kingdom: Plantae
- Clade: Tracheophytes
- Clade: Angiosperms
- Clade: Monocots
- Clade: Commelinids
- Order: Poales
- Family: Bromeliaceae
- Genus: Aechmea
- Subgenus: Aechmea subg. Platyaechmea
- Species: A. tillandsioides

Binomial name
- Aechmea tillandsioides (Mart. ex Schult. & Schult.f.) Baker

Synonyms
- Billbergia tillandsioides Mart. ex Schult. & Schult.f.; Ortgiesia tillandsioides (Mart. ex Schult. & Schult.f.) Regel; Portea tillandsioides (Mart. ex Schult. & Schult.f.) G.Nicholson; Platyaechmea tillandsioides (Mart. ex Schult. & Schult.f.) L.B.Sm. & W.J.Kress; Billbergia gracilis Poepp. ex Beer; Platystachys gracilis Beer; Ortgiesia tillandsioides var. nidulans Regel; Aechmea vrieseoides Baker; Aechmea chiriquensis Baker; Aechmea xiphophylla Baker; Aechmea kienastii E.Morren ex Mez; Aechmea tillandsioides var. kienastii (E.Morren ex Mez) L.B.Sm.; Platyaechmea tillandsioides var. kienastii (E.Morren ex Mez) L.B.Sm. & W.J.Kress

= Aechmea tillandsioides =

Species of plant

Aechmea tillandsioides is a bromeliad widespread across southern Mexico, Central America, and northern South America (Colombia, Venezuela, the Guianas, Ecuador, northern Brazil). It is widely cultivated in other regions as an ornamental plant. This plant is cited in Flora Brasiliensis by Carl Friedrich Philipp von Martius.

== Cultivars ==
- Aechmea 'Tillantini'
