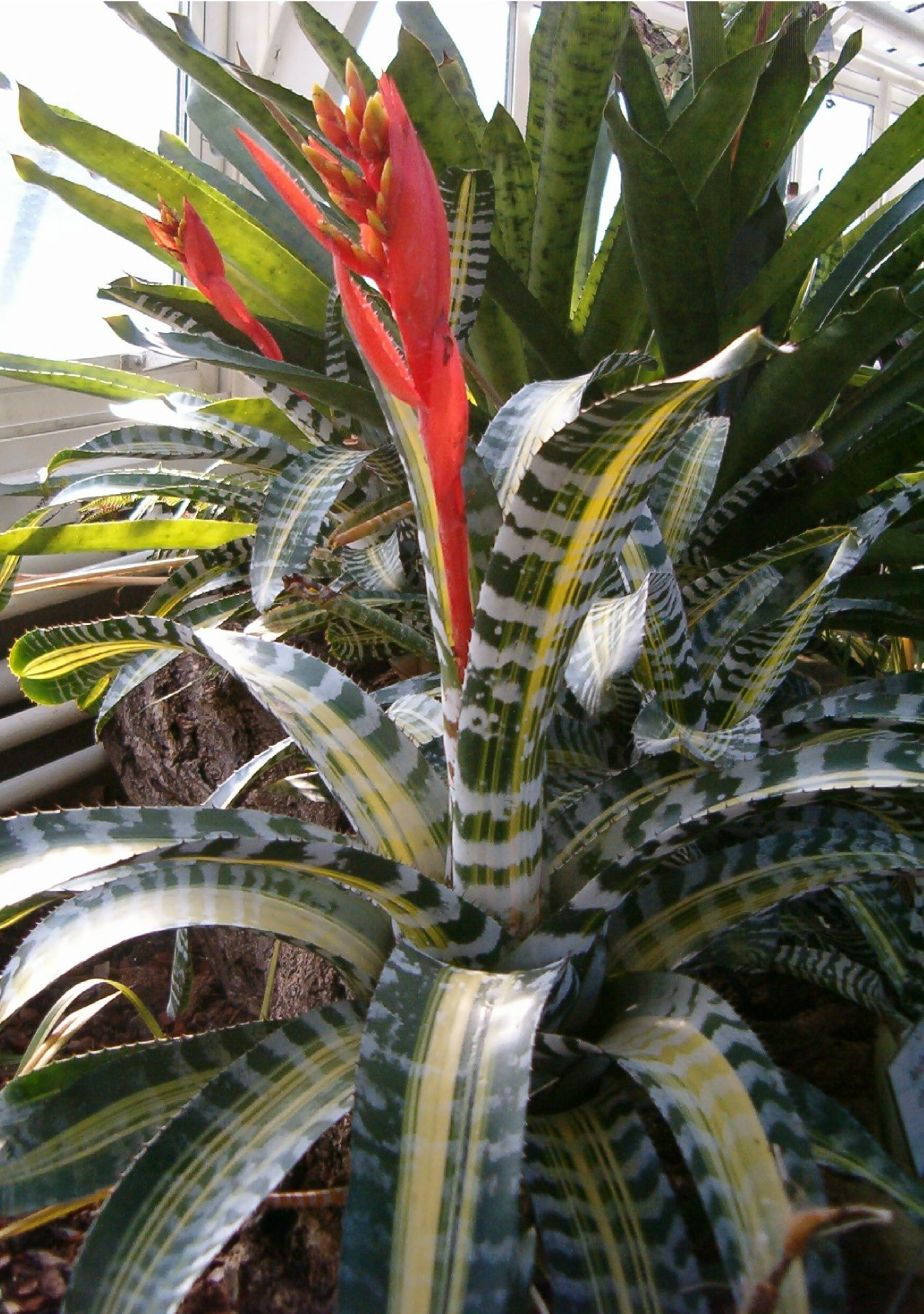
- Aechmea chantinii at the Berlin-Dahlem Botanical Garden and Botanical Museum

Scientific classification
- Kingdom: Plantae
- Clade: Tracheophytes
- Clade: Angiosperms
- Clade: Monocots
- Clade: Commelinids
- Order: Poales
- Family: Bromeliaceae
- Genus: Aechmea
- Subgenus: Aechmea subg. Platyaechmea (Baker) Baker

Species
- See text

= Aechmea subg. Platyaechmea =

Subgenus of flowering plants

Platyaechmea is a subgenus of the genus Aechmea.

== Species ==
Species accepted by Encyclopedia of Bromeliads as of October 2022:

Image	Scientific name	Distribution
	Aechmea anomala L.B.Sm.	Colombia (Amazonia)
	Aechmea caesia E.Morren ex Baker	Brazil (Rio de Janeiro)
	Aechmea chantinii (Carrière) Baker	Brazil, Venezuela, Colombia, Ecuador and Peru
	Aechmea contracta (Martius ex Schultes f.) Baker	Venezuela, Colombia, Peru, Guyana and northern Brazil
	Aechmea cucullata H.Luther	Colombia and Ecuador
	Aechmea dealbata E.Morren ex Baker	Brazil
	Aechmea dichlamydea Baker	Venezuela and to Trinidad and Tobago
	Aechmea distichantha Lemaire	northern Argentina, Bolivia, Paraguay, and Uruguay
	Aechmea gentryi H.Luther & K.Norton	Ecuador
	Aechmea longipedunculata Betancur & Aguirre-Santoro	Colombia
	Aechmea manzanaresiana H.Luther	Ecuador
	Aechmea moorei H.Luther	Ecuador and Peru
	Aechmea reclinata C.Sastre & R.Brithmer	Martinique
	Aechmea retusa L.B.Sm.	Ecuador, Colombia and Peru
	Aechmea romeroi L.B.Sm.	Ecuador and Colombia
	Aechmea serrata (L.) Mez	Martinique in the West Indies
	Aechmea smithiorum Mez	Lesser Antilles: Montserrat, Guadeloupe, Dominica, Martinique, St. Lucia, St. Vincent, Grenada
	Aechmea sumidourensis Leme	Brazil (São Paulo)
	Aechmea tessmannii Harms	Ecuador, Peru, and Colombia
	Aechmea tillandsioides (Martius ex Schultes f.) Baker	Colombia, Venezuela, the Guianas, Ecuador, northern Brazil
	Aechmea wittmackiana (Regel) Mez	Brazil (São Paulo)
	Aechmea zebrina L.B.Sm.	f eastern Ecuador and southern Colombia
