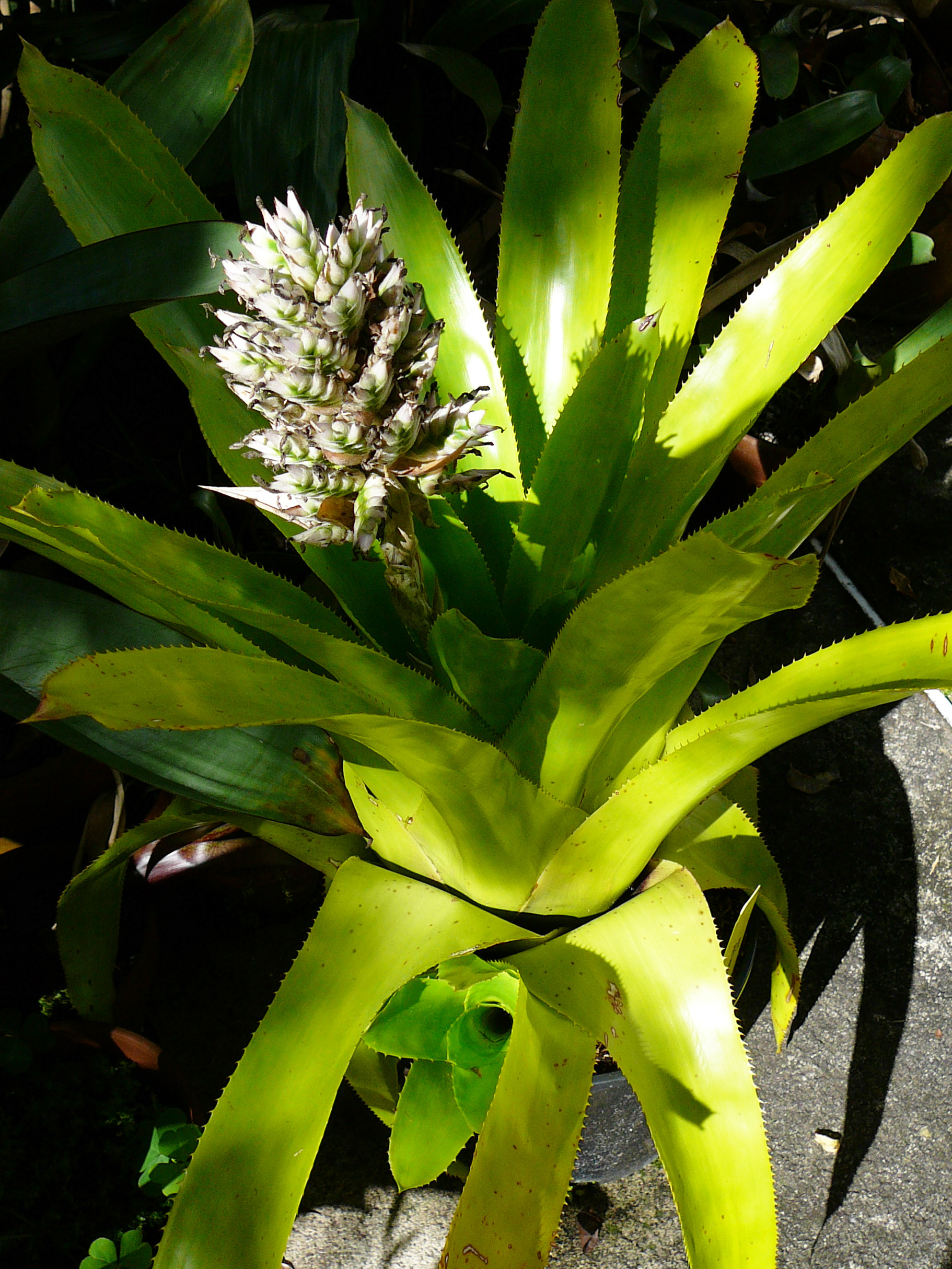

Scientific classification
- Kingdom: Plantae
- Clade: Embryophytes
- Clade: Tracheophytes
- Clade: Spermatophytes
- Clade: Angiosperms
- Clade: Monocots
- Clade: Commelinids
- Order: Poales
- Family: Bromeliaceae
- Genus: Aechmea
- Subgenus: Aechmea subg. Platyaechmea
- Species: A. smithiorum

Binomial name
- Aechmea smithiorum Mez

Synonyms
- Homotypic Synonyms: Platyaechmea smithiorum (Mez) L.B.Sm. & W.J.Kress

= Aechmea smithiorum =

Species of flowering plant

Aechmea smithiorum is a species of flowering plant in the bromeliad family, Bromeliaceae. It is a rare medium-sized bromeliad with broad green leaves and a striking white rosette. It grows as an epiphyte and sometime terrestrially. It is indigenous to seasonal forest and lower montane rainforests of the Lesser Antilles: Montserrat, Guadeloupe, Dominica, Martinique, St. Lucia, St. Vincent, Grenada.

== Varieties ==
Two varieties are recognized:

1. Aechmea smithiorum var. longistipitata E.Gross - St. Vincent
2. Aechmea smithiorum var. smithiorum - Lesser Antilles

== Cultivars ==
- Aechmea 'Amethyst'
