= Aechmea wittmackiana =

Scientific classification
- Kingdom: Plantae
- Clade: Tracheophytes
- Clade: Angiosperms
- Clade: Monocots
- Clade: Commelinids
- Order: Poales
- Family: Bromeliaceae
- Genus: Aechmea
- Subgenus: Aechmea subg. Platyaechmea
- Species: A. wittmackiana

Binomial name
- Aechmea wittmackiana (Regel) Mez

Synonyms
- Quesnelia wittmackiana Regel; Platyaechmea wittmackiana (Regel) L.B.Sm. & W.J.Kress; Aechmea jucunda E.Morren ex Baker; Aechmea distichantha var. canaliculata M.B.Foster

Species of flowering plant

Aechmea wittmackiana is a plant species in the genus Aechmea. This species is endemic to the State of São Paulo in Brazil.

== Cultivars ==
- Aechmea 'Warren Loose'
