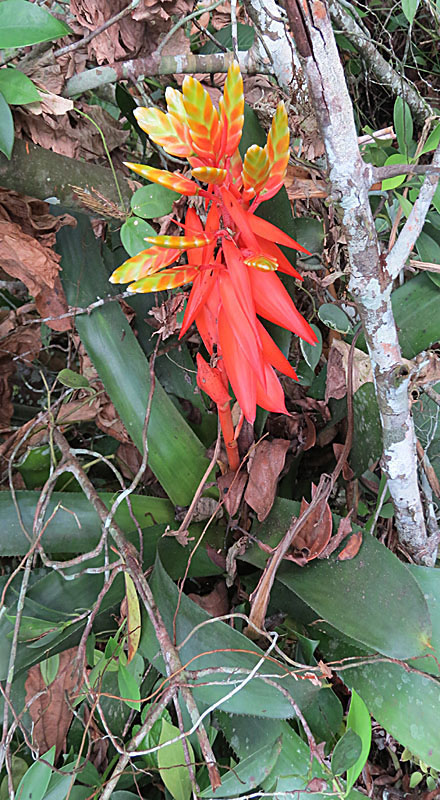

Scientific classification
- Kingdom: Plantae
- Clade: Tracheophytes
- Clade: Angiosperms
- Clade: Monocots
- Clade: Commelinids
- Order: Poales
- Family: Bromeliaceae
- Genus: Aechmea
- Subgenus: Aechmea subg. Platyaechmea
- Species: A. retusa

Binomial name
- Aechmea retusa L.B.Sm.

Synonyms
- Platyaechmea retusa (L.B.Sm.) L.B.Sm. & W.J.Kress

= Aechmea retusa =

Species of flowering plant

Aechmea retusa is a plant species in the genus Aechmea. This species is native to Ecuador, Colombia and Peru.

== Cultivars ==
- Aechmea 'Brimstone'
- Aechmea 'Hellfire'
- Aechmea 'Hercules'
- Aechmea 'Laura Lynn'
- Aechmea 'Orange River'
- Aechmea 'Yapi'
