= Aechmea contracta =

Scientific classification
- Kingdom: Plantae
- Clade: Tracheophytes
- Clade: Angiosperms
- Clade: Monocots
- Clade: Commelinids
- Order: Poales
- Family: Bromeliaceae
- Genus: Aechmea
- Subgenus: Aechmea subg. Platyaechmea
- Species: A. contracta

Binomial name
- Aechmea contracta (Mart. ex Schult.f.) Baker

Synonyms
- Billbergia contracta Mart. ex Schult. & Schult.f.; Platyaechmea contracta (Mart. ex Schult. & Schult.f.) L.B.Sm. & W.J.Kress; Aechmea trigona E.Pereira

Species of flowering plant

Aechmea contracta is a species of flowering plant in the Bromeliaceae family. It is native to Venezuela, Colombia, Peru, Guyana and northern Brazil.
