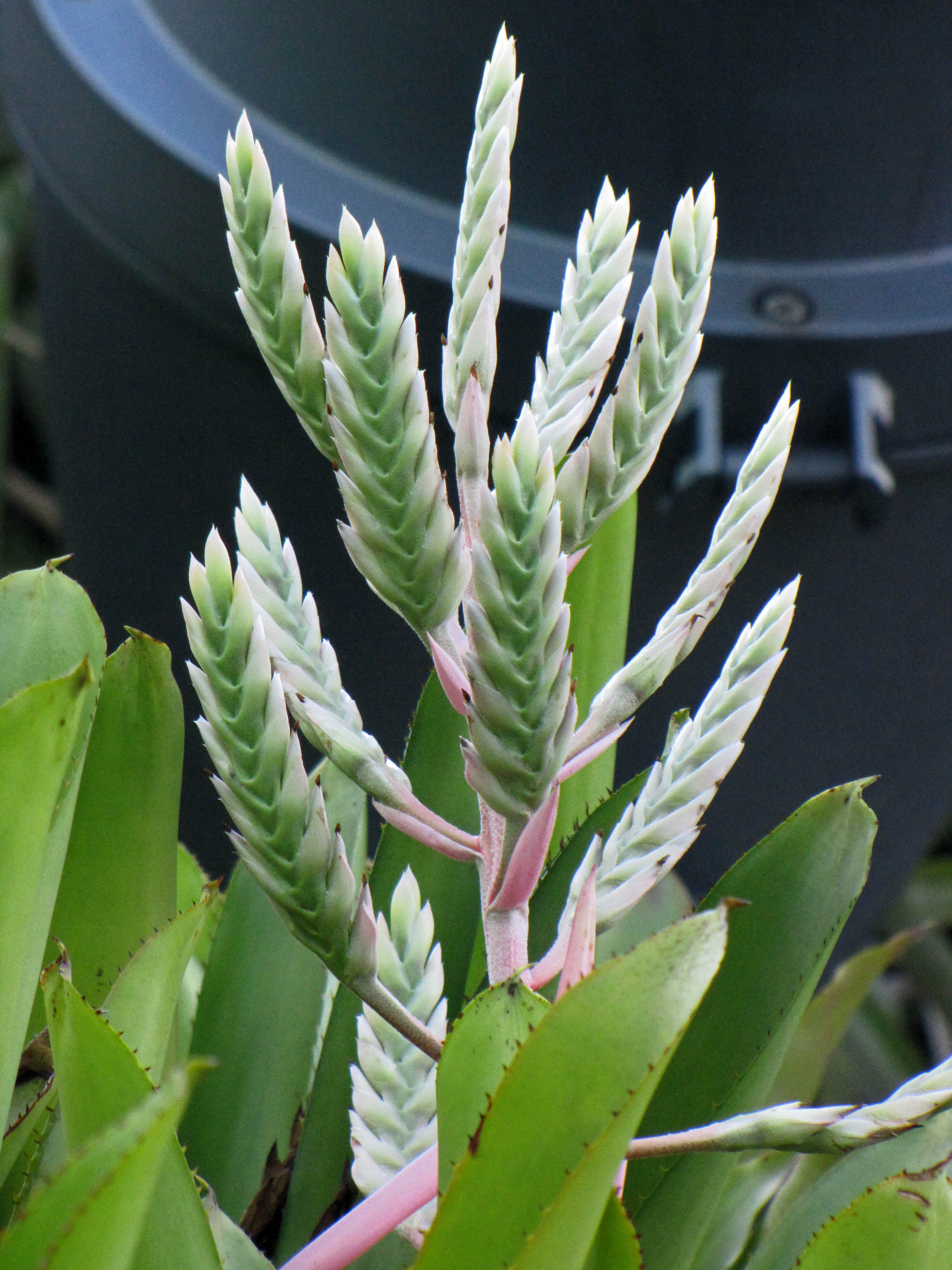
- Aechmea dichlamydea at the Gardens by the Bay, Singapore

Scientific classification
- Kingdom: Plantae
- Clade: Tracheophytes
- Clade: Angiosperms
- Clade: Monocots
- Clade: Commelinids
- Order: Poales
- Family: Bromeliaceae
- Genus: Aechmea
- Subgenus: Aechmea subg. Platyaechmea
- Species: A. dichlamydea

Binomial name
- Aechmea dichlamydea Baker

Synonyms
- Platyaechmea dichlamydea (Baker) L.B.Sm. & W.J.Kress; Aechmea nichollsii Baker

= Aechmea dichlamydea =

Species of flowering plant

Aechmea dichlamydea is a species of bromeliad in the genus Aechmea. This species is native to Venezuela and to Trinidad and Tobago.

== Varieties ==
Three botanical varieties are recognized:

1. Aechmea dichlamydea var. dichlamydea - Tobago
2. Aechmea dichlamydea var. pariaensis Pittendr. - Sucre
3. Aechmea dichlamydea var. trinitensis L.B.Sm. - Venezuela and Trinidad

== Cultivars ==
- Aechmea 'Orange Sunset'
- Aechmea 'Shelldancer'
