= Aechmea romeroi =

Scientific classification
- Kingdom: Plantae
- Clade: Tracheophytes
- Clade: Angiosperms
- Clade: Monocots
- Clade: Commelinids
- Order: Poales
- Family: Bromeliaceae
- Genus: Aechmea
- Subgenus: Aechmea subg. Platyaechmea
- Species: A. romeroi

Binomial name
- Aechmea romeroi L.B.Sm.

Synonyms
- Platyaechmea romeroi (L.B.Sm.) L.B.Sm. & W.J.Kress

Species of flowering plant

Aechmea romeroi is a plant species in the genus Aechmea. This species is native to Ecuador and Colombia.
