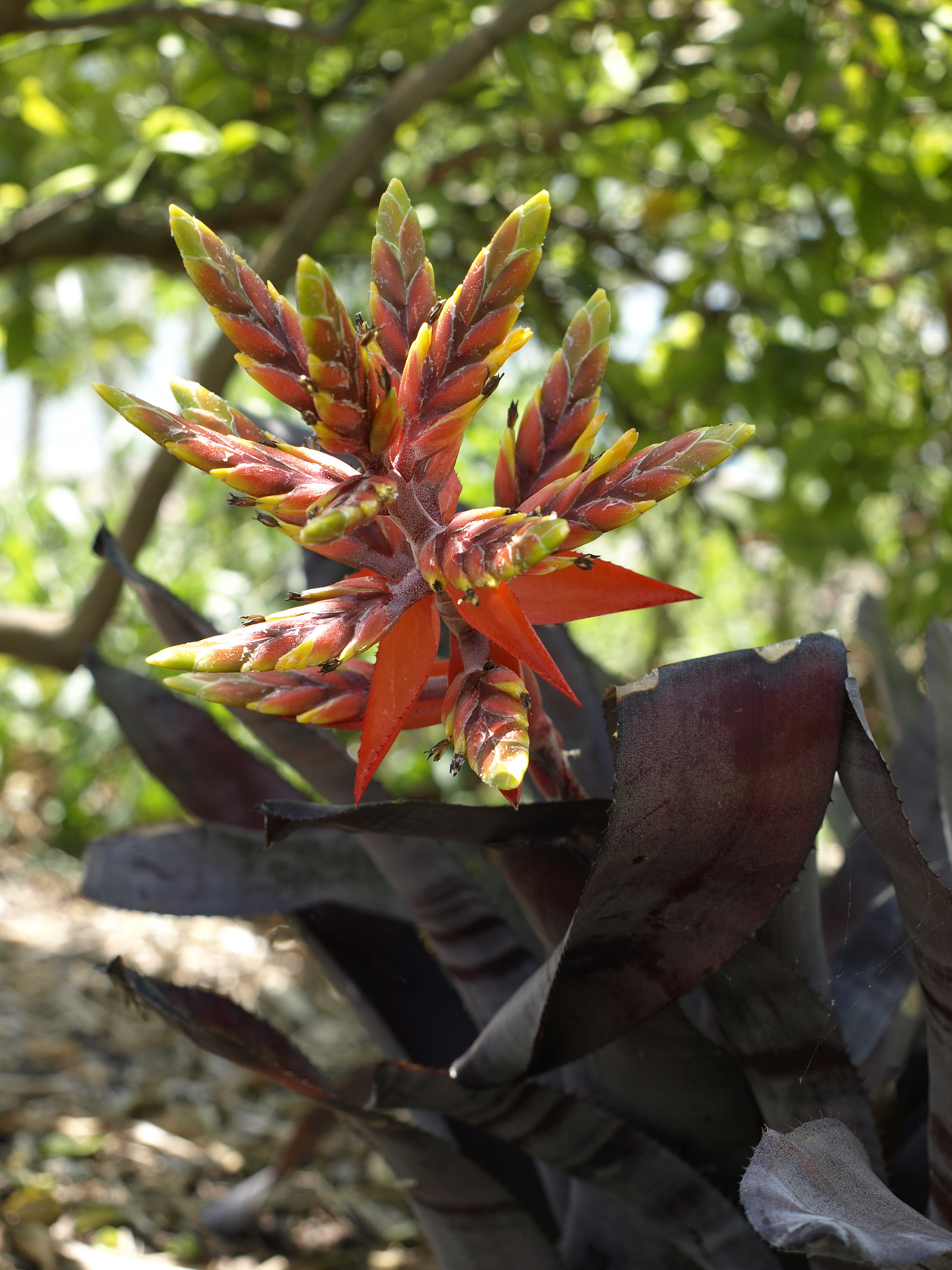

Scientific classification
- Kingdom: Plantae
- Clade: Tracheophytes
- Clade: Angiosperms
- Clade: Monocots
- Clade: Commelinids
- Order: Poales
- Family: Bromeliaceae
- Genus: Aechmea
- Subgenus: Aechmea subg. Platyaechmea
- Species: A. tessmannii

Binomial name
- Aechmea tessmannii Harms

Synonyms
- Platyaechmea tessmannii (Harms) L.B.Sm. & W.J.Kress

= Aechmea tessmannii =

Species of flowering plant

Aechmea tessmannii is a plant species in the genus Aechmea. This species is native to Ecuador, Peru, and Colombia.

== Cultivars ==
Numerous cultivars are grown as ornamentals, including

- Aechmea 'Caloosa'
- Aechmea 'Chocolate'
- Aechmea 'Cosmic Starburst'
- Aechmea 'Jimmie Knight'
- Aechmea 'Jupiter'
- Aechmea 'Starbrite'
- × Anamea 'Prima Ballerina'
- × Androlaechmea 'Sampson'
- × Neomea 'Leonardo'
