= Aechmea caesia =

Scientific classification
- Kingdom: Plantae
- Clade: Tracheophytes
- Clade: Angiosperms
- Clade: Monocots
- Clade: Commelinids
- Order: Poales
- Family: Bromeliaceae
- Genus: Aechmea
- Subgenus: Aechmea subg. Platyaechmea
- Species: A. caesia

Binomial name
- Aechmea caesia E.Morren ex Baker

Synonyms
- Platyaechmea caesia (E.Morren ex Baker) L.B.Sm. & W.J.Kress

Species of flowering plant

Aechmea caesia is a plant species in the genus Aechmea. This species is endemic to the State of Rio de Janeiro in Brazil. It is an epiphyte and grows primarily in the wet tropical biome.

== Cultivars ==
- Aechmea 'Sarah'
