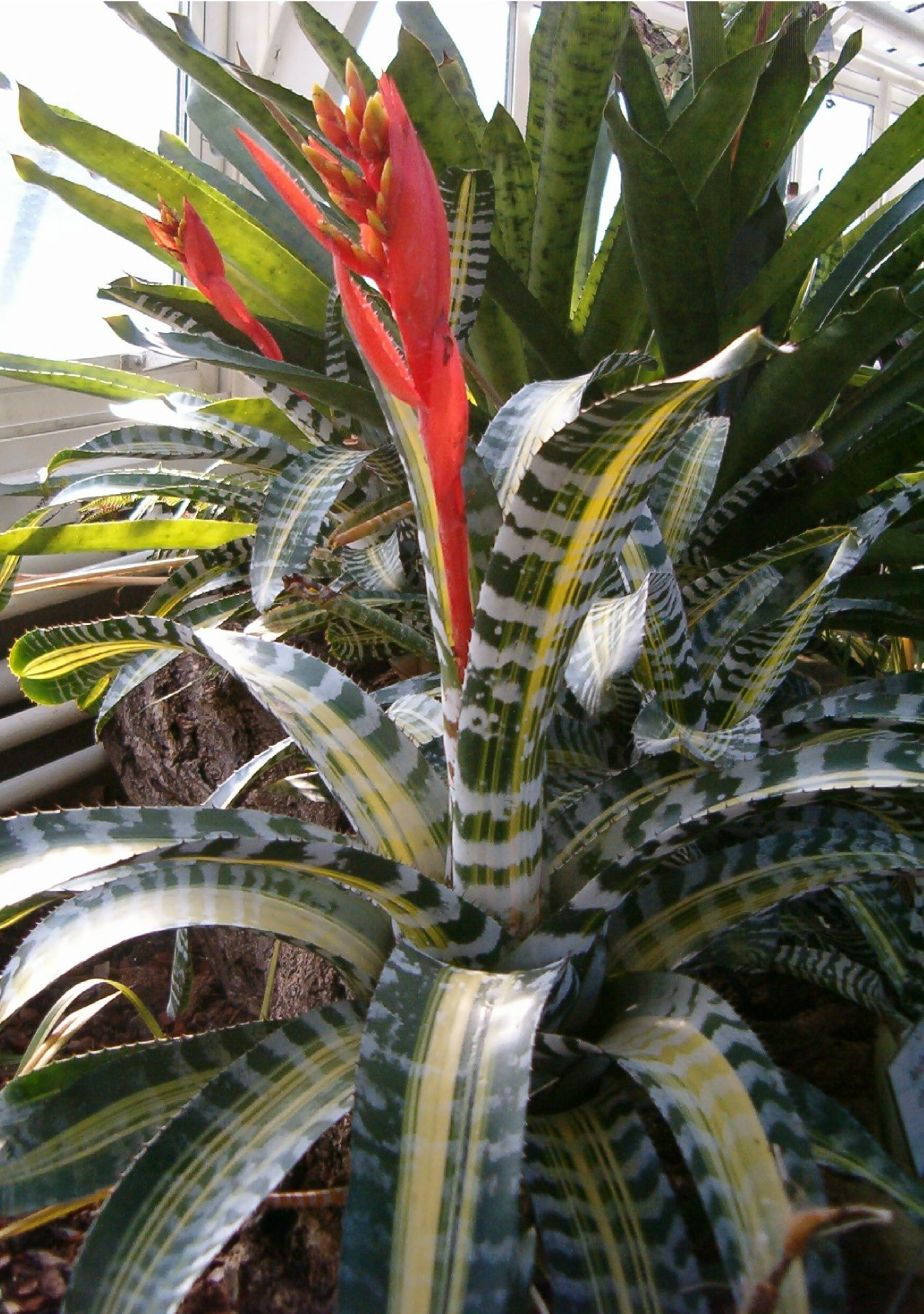
- Cultivar 'Variegata' with coloured leaves

Scientific classification
- Kingdom: Plantae
- Clade: Tracheophytes
- Clade: Angiosperms
- Clade: Monocots
- Clade: Commelinids
- Order: Poales
- Family: Bromeliaceae
- Genus: Aechmea
- Subgenus: Aechmea subg. Platyaechmea
- Species: A. chantinii

Binomial name
- Aechmea chantinii (Carrière) Baker

Synonyms
- Billbergia chantinii Carrière; Platyaechmea chantinii (Carrière) L.B.Sm. & W.J.Kress; Aechmea amazonica Ule; Aechmea chantinii f. amazonica (Ule) H.Luther

= Aechmea chantinii =

Amazonian zebra plant

Species of flowering plant

Aechmea chantinii, commonly known as Amazonian zebra plant, is a species bromeliad often used as an ornamental plant. It is native to the Amazon rainforest in Brazil, Venezuela, Colombia, Ecuador and Peru.

The following subspecies are recognized :

- Aechmea chantinii var. chantinii (Carrière) Baker, 1889 - most of species range
- Aechmea chantinii var. fuchsii H.Luther (1987 publ. 1988). - Ecuador

There are numerous cultivars of A. chantinii.
