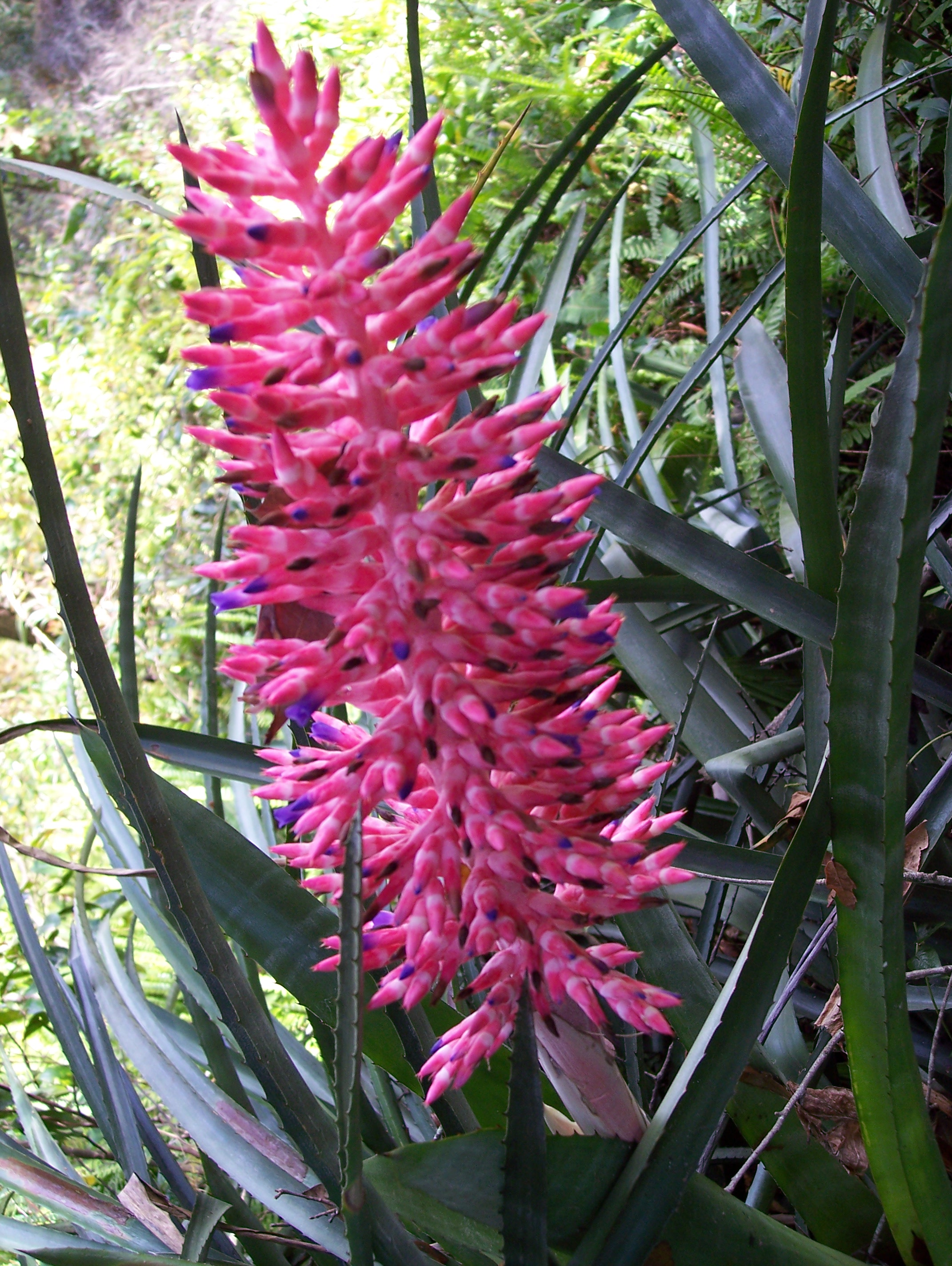

Scientific classification
- Kingdom: Plantae
- Clade: Tracheophytes
- Clade: Angiosperms
- Clade: Monocots
- Clade: Commelinids
- Order: Poales
- Family: Bromeliaceae
- Genus: Aechmea
- Subgenus: Aechmea subg. Platyaechmea
- Species: A. distichantha

Binomial name
- Aechmea distichantha Lem.

Synonyms
- Billbergia distichostachya Lem.; Billbergia polystachya Lindl. & Paxton; Platyaechmea distichantha (Lem.) L.B.Sm. & W.J.Kress; Quesnelia disticantha (Lem.) Lindm.; Hoplophytum distichanthum (Lem.) Beer; Hohenbergia distichantha (Lem.) Baker; Aechmea distichantha var. typica L.B.Sm.; Tillandsia polystachia Vell.; Billbergia polystachia Lindl. & Paxton; Hoplophytum polystachium (Lindl. & Paxton) Beer; Aechmea hookeri Lem.; Aechmea excavata Baker; Aechmea brasiliensis Regel; Aechmea myriophylla E.Morren ex Baker; Aechmea microphylla Mez; Aechmea polystachia (Lindl. & Paxton) Mez; Nidularium hydrophorum Rojas; Aechmea platyphylla Hassl.; Aechmea glaziovii Baker; Hoiriri polystachya (Baker) Kuntze; Platyaechmea distichantha var. glaziovii (Baker) L.B.Sm. & W.J.Kress; Aechmea minor E.Morren; Aechmea pulchella E.Morren ex Mez; Aechmea regelii Mez; Chevaliera grandiceps Griseb.; Aechmea grandiceps (Griseb.) Mez; Aechmea rubra Silveira; Aechmea involucrifera Mez

= Aechmea distichantha =

Species of flowering plant

Aechmea distichantha, the Brazilian vaseplant, or vase plant, is a bromeliad typical of Cerrado vegetation in Brazil, which is also native to northern Argentina, Bolivia, Paraguay, and Uruguay. This plant is often used as an ornamental plant.

The following varieties are recognized:

1. Aechmea distichantha var. distichantha - Brazil, Argentina, Paraguay, Uruguay
2. Aechmea distichantha var. glaziovii (Baker) L.B.Sm.(1943) - southeastern Brazil
3. Aechmea distichantha var. schlumbergeri E.Morren ex Mez (1892) - Bolivia, Brazil, Argentina, Paraguay
4. Aechmea distichantha var. vernicosa E.Pereira (1979) - Rio de Janeiro State

== Cultivars ==
- Aechmea 'Chantichantha'
- Aechmea 'Dawson'
- Aechmea 'Distibachii'
- Aechmea 'Pacifica'
- × Neomea 'Flame'
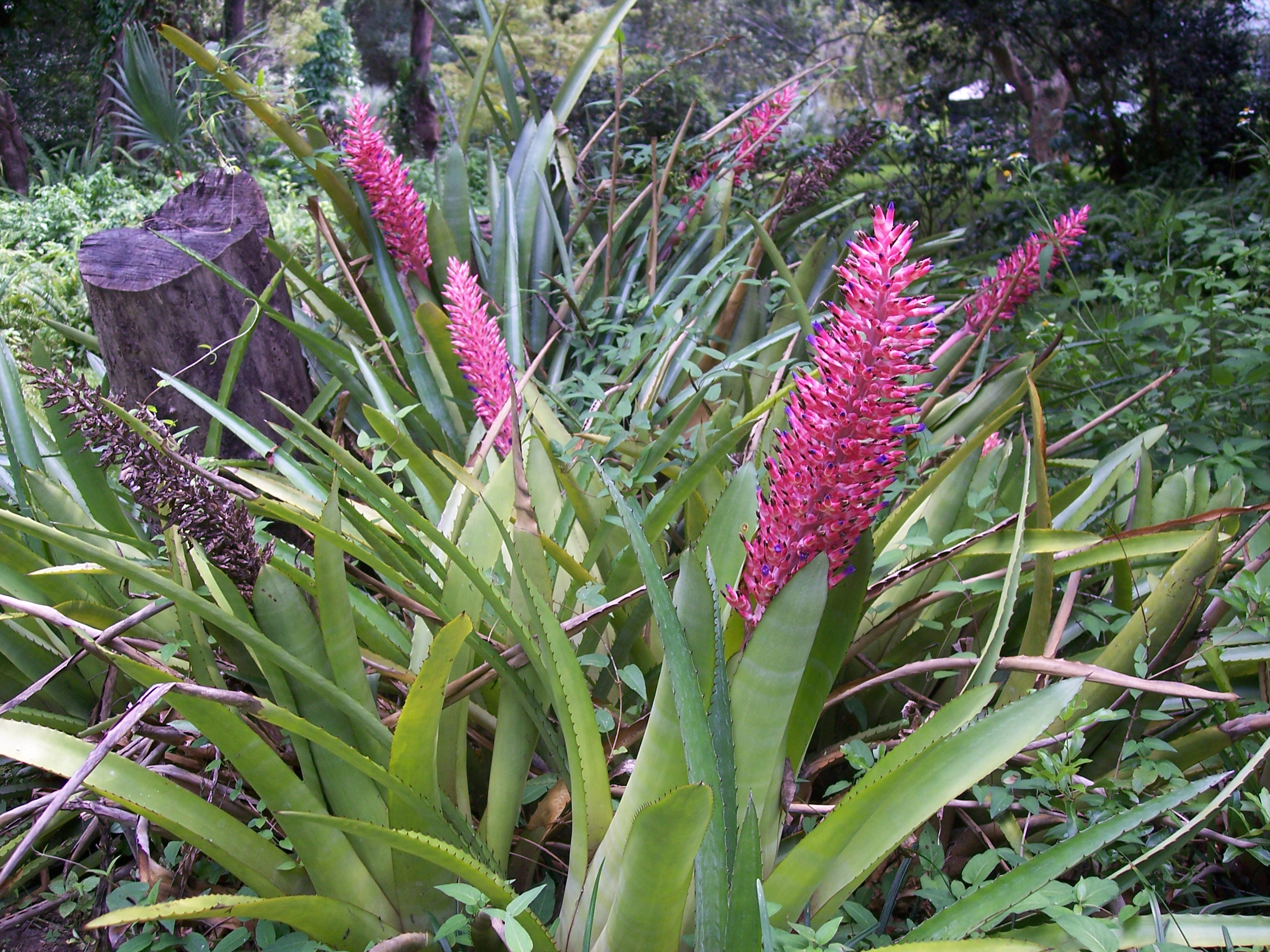
Flowering patch of A. disticantha

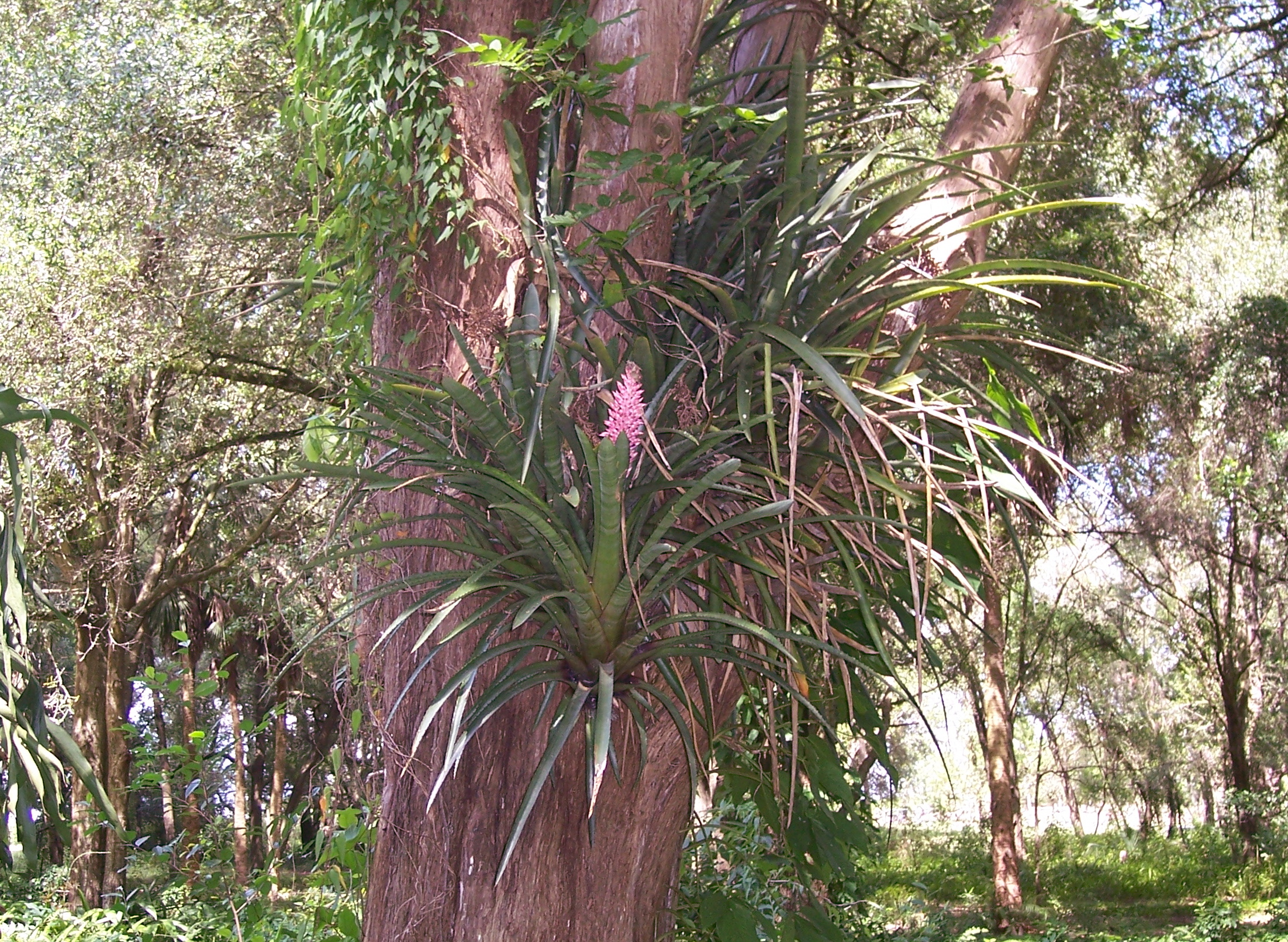
A. disticantha as an epiphyte.
