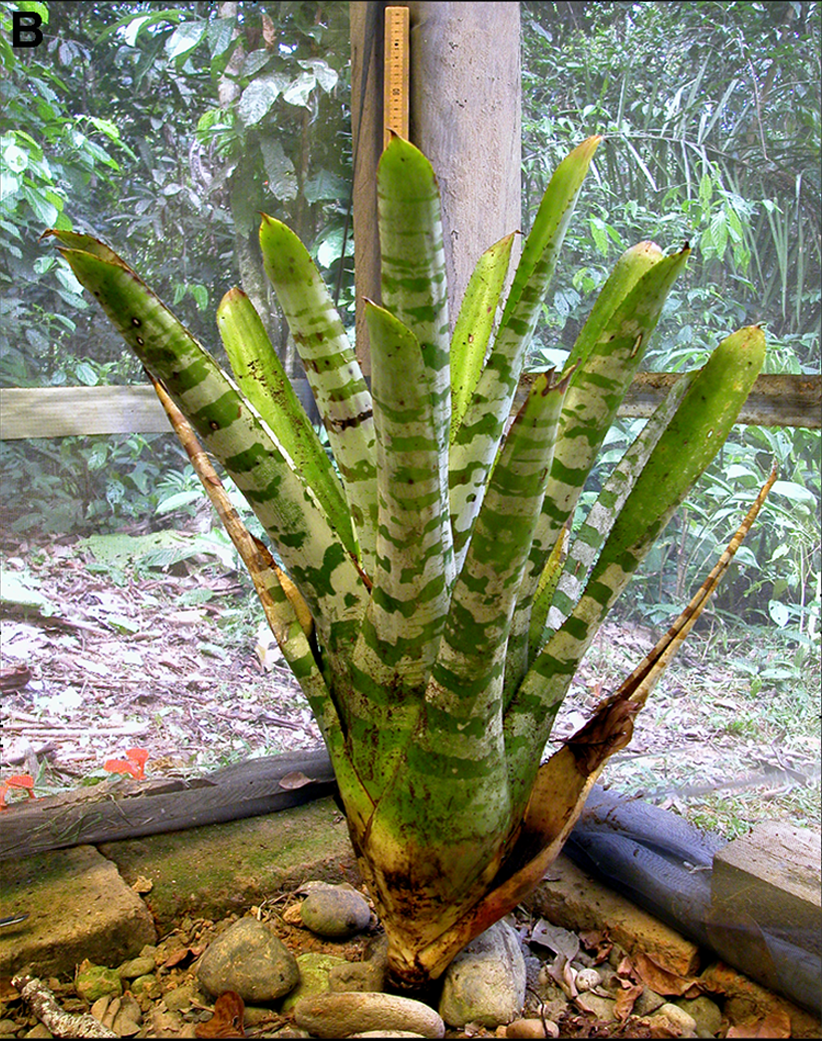

Scientific classification
- Kingdom: Plantae
- Clade: Tracheophytes
- Clade: Angiosperms
- Clade: Monocots
- Clade: Commelinids
- Order: Poales
- Family: Bromeliaceae
- Genus: Aechmea
- Subgenus: Aechmea subg. Platyaechmea
- Species: A. zebrina

Binomial name
- Aechmea zebrina L.B.Sm.

Synonyms
- Platyaechmea zebrina (L.B.Sm.) L.B.Sm. & W.J.Kress

= Aechmea zebrina =

Species of flowering plant

Aechmea zebrina is a plant species in the genus Aechmea. This species is native to Ecuador and Colombia; it is relatively common in the lowland Amazon region of eastern Ecuador and southern Colombia.

== Description ==
Aechmea zebrina is a large epiphytic bromeliad that can grow more than 1 metre tall and wide and hold nearly 4 litres of water between its leaves. It typically occurs in the upper canopy of overstory trees at heights of 18–45 m. A single tree can host more than 150 Aechmea zebrina.

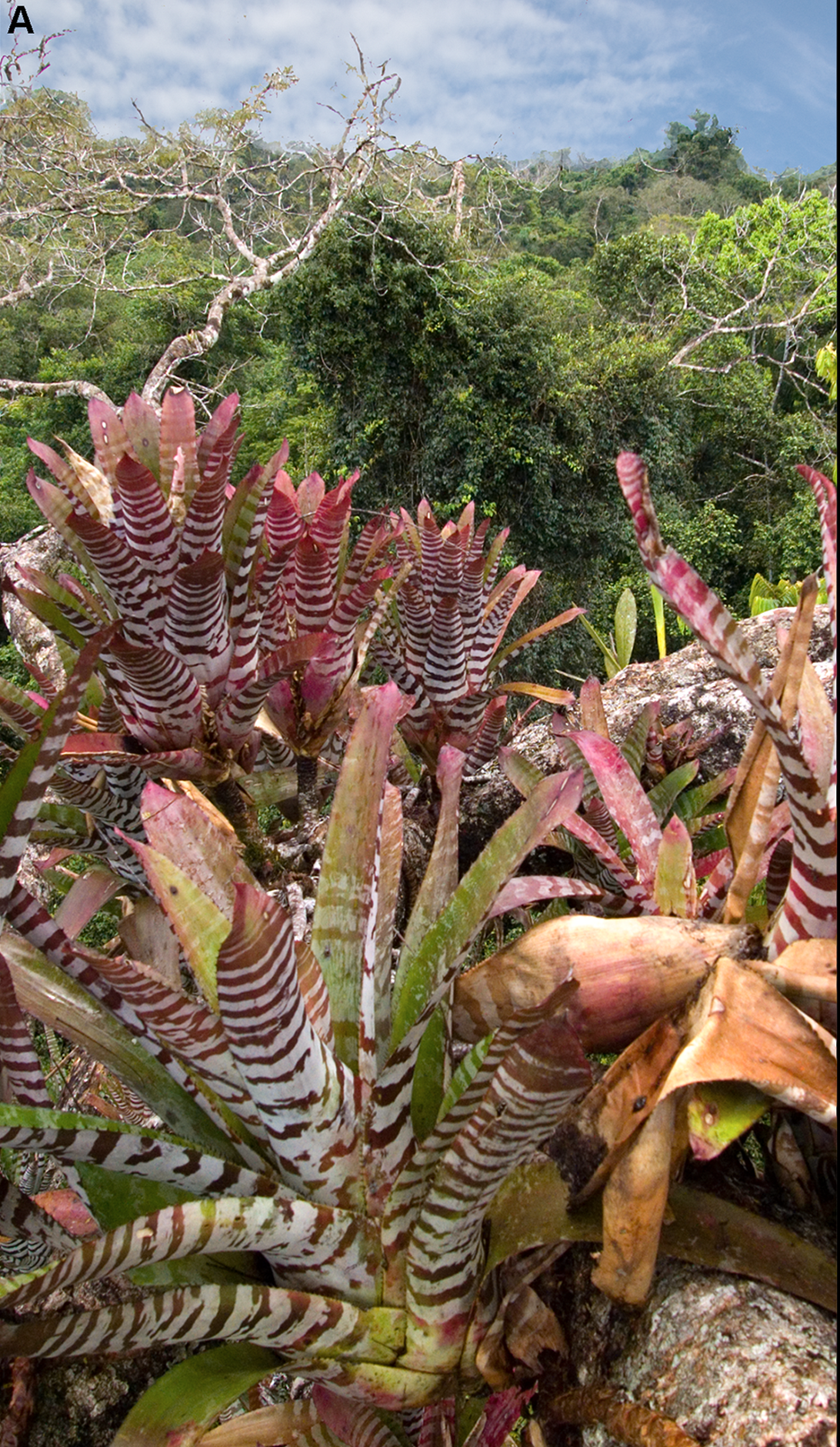
Aechmea zebrina in its natural arboreal habitat in Ecuador.

== Cultivars ==
- Aechmea 'Hercules'
- Aechmea 'Orinoco'
- × Neomea 'Valli'
